

117001–117100 

|-bgcolor=#E9E9E9
| 117001 ||  || — || April 24, 2004 || Socorro || LINEAR || ADE || align=right | 3.0 km || 
|-id=002 bgcolor=#fefefe
| 117002 ||  || — || April 23, 2004 || Socorro || LINEAR || V || align=right | 1.2 km || 
|-id=003 bgcolor=#fefefe
| 117003 ||  || — || April 23, 2004 || Socorro || LINEAR || — || align=right | 1.5 km || 
|-id=004 bgcolor=#E9E9E9
| 117004 ||  || — || April 25, 2004 || Socorro || LINEAR || — || align=right | 4.0 km || 
|-id=005 bgcolor=#E9E9E9
| 117005 ||  || — || April 25, 2004 || Bergisch Gladbach || W. Bickel || — || align=right | 5.9 km || 
|-id=006 bgcolor=#fefefe
| 117006 ||  || — || April 25, 2004 || Socorro || LINEAR || — || align=right | 1.6 km || 
|-id=007 bgcolor=#d6d6d6
| 117007 ||  || — || April 25, 2004 || Socorro || LINEAR || HYG || align=right | 5.1 km || 
|-id=008 bgcolor=#d6d6d6
| 117008 ||  || — || April 26, 2004 || Kitt Peak || Spacewatch || — || align=right | 4.8 km || 
|-id=009 bgcolor=#E9E9E9
| 117009 ||  || — || April 16, 2004 || Socorro || LINEAR || EUN || align=right | 2.7 km || 
|-id=010 bgcolor=#d6d6d6
| 117010 ||  || — || May 10, 2004 || Catalina || CSS || URS || align=right | 6.5 km || 
|-id=011 bgcolor=#d6d6d6
| 117011 ||  || — || May 9, 2004 || Palomar || NEAT || THM || align=right | 3.7 km || 
|-id=012 bgcolor=#E9E9E9
| 117012 ||  || — || May 11, 2004 || Reedy Creek || J. Broughton || — || align=right | 4.0 km || 
|-id=013 bgcolor=#d6d6d6
| 117013 ||  || — || May 12, 2004 || Reedy Creek || J. Broughton || — || align=right | 3.1 km || 
|-id=014 bgcolor=#E9E9E9
| 117014 ||  || — || May 8, 2004 || Palomar || NEAT || — || align=right | 2.4 km || 
|-id=015 bgcolor=#E9E9E9
| 117015 ||  || — || May 10, 2004 || Palomar || NEAT || MIS || align=right | 5.6 km || 
|-id=016 bgcolor=#d6d6d6
| 117016 ||  || — || May 12, 2004 || Catalina || CSS || — || align=right | 5.9 km || 
|-id=017 bgcolor=#d6d6d6
| 117017 ||  || — || May 12, 2004 || Catalina || CSS || ALA || align=right | 6.6 km || 
|-id=018 bgcolor=#E9E9E9
| 117018 ||  || — || May 13, 2004 || Palomar || NEAT || — || align=right | 2.9 km || 
|-id=019 bgcolor=#d6d6d6
| 117019 ||  || — || May 9, 2004 || Haleakala || NEAT || EOS || align=right | 4.0 km || 
|-id=020 bgcolor=#E9E9E9
| 117020 Janeconlin ||  ||  || May 10, 2004 || Catalina || CSS || — || align=right | 5.6 km || 
|-id=021 bgcolor=#E9E9E9
| 117021 ||  || — || May 10, 2004 || Palomar || NEAT || — || align=right | 4.2 km || 
|-id=022 bgcolor=#d6d6d6
| 117022 ||  || — || May 12, 2004 || Catalina || CSS || — || align=right | 5.0 km || 
|-id=023 bgcolor=#d6d6d6
| 117023 ||  || — || May 12, 2004 || Catalina || CSS || — || align=right | 7.3 km || 
|-id=024 bgcolor=#E9E9E9
| 117024 ||  || — || May 12, 2004 || Catalina || CSS || — || align=right | 2.0 km || 
|-id=025 bgcolor=#E9E9E9
| 117025 ||  || — || May 12, 2004 || Catalina || CSS || MAR || align=right | 2.3 km || 
|-id=026 bgcolor=#d6d6d6
| 117026 ||  || — || May 13, 2004 || Socorro || LINEAR || — || align=right | 8.2 km || 
|-id=027 bgcolor=#d6d6d6
| 117027 ||  || — || May 13, 2004 || Reedy Creek || J. Broughton || — || align=right | 6.1 km || 
|-id=028 bgcolor=#d6d6d6
| 117028 ||  || — || May 13, 2004 || Reedy Creek || J. Broughton || HYG || align=right | 6.5 km || 
|-id=029 bgcolor=#d6d6d6
| 117029 ||  || — || May 10, 2004 || Palomar || NEAT || — || align=right | 3.3 km || 
|-id=030 bgcolor=#E9E9E9
| 117030 ||  || — || May 10, 2004 || Palomar || NEAT || — || align=right | 2.1 km || 
|-id=031 bgcolor=#fefefe
| 117031 ||  || — || May 12, 2004 || Siding Spring || SSS || — || align=right | 1.7 km || 
|-id=032 bgcolor=#E9E9E9
| 117032 Davidlane ||  ||  || May 14, 2004 || Jarnac || T. Glinos, D. H. Levy, W. Levy || — || align=right | 4.9 km || 
|-id=033 bgcolor=#fefefe
| 117033 ||  || — || May 9, 2004 || Kitt Peak || Spacewatch || V || align=right | 1.2 km || 
|-id=034 bgcolor=#d6d6d6
| 117034 ||  || — || May 13, 2004 || Kitt Peak || Spacewatch || — || align=right | 4.1 km || 
|-id=035 bgcolor=#d6d6d6
| 117035 ||  || — || May 13, 2004 || Palomar || NEAT || — || align=right | 3.6 km || 
|-id=036 bgcolor=#d6d6d6
| 117036 ||  || — || May 15, 2004 || Socorro || LINEAR || — || align=right | 4.7 km || 
|-id=037 bgcolor=#d6d6d6
| 117037 ||  || — || May 15, 2004 || Socorro || LINEAR || — || align=right | 3.7 km || 
|-id=038 bgcolor=#fefefe
| 117038 ||  || — || May 15, 2004 || Socorro || LINEAR || V || align=right | 1.2 km || 
|-id=039 bgcolor=#E9E9E9
| 117039 ||  || — || May 15, 2004 || Socorro || LINEAR || — || align=right | 3.8 km || 
|-id=040 bgcolor=#E9E9E9
| 117040 ||  || — || May 15, 2004 || Socorro || LINEAR || — || align=right | 2.2 km || 
|-id=041 bgcolor=#E9E9E9
| 117041 ||  || — || May 15, 2004 || Socorro || LINEAR || GER || align=right | 3.4 km || 
|-id=042 bgcolor=#E9E9E9
| 117042 ||  || — || May 15, 2004 || Socorro || LINEAR || — || align=right | 1.9 km || 
|-id=043 bgcolor=#d6d6d6
| 117043 ||  || — || May 15, 2004 || Socorro || LINEAR || — || align=right | 4.8 km || 
|-id=044 bgcolor=#E9E9E9
| 117044 ||  || — || May 15, 2004 || Siding Spring || SSS || — || align=right | 5.1 km || 
|-id=045 bgcolor=#d6d6d6
| 117045 ||  || — || May 15, 2004 || Socorro || LINEAR || KOR || align=right | 3.0 km || 
|-id=046 bgcolor=#d6d6d6
| 117046 ||  || — || May 15, 2004 || Socorro || LINEAR || EOS || align=right | 4.9 km || 
|-id=047 bgcolor=#E9E9E9
| 117047 ||  || — || May 14, 2004 || Socorro || LINEAR || — || align=right | 3.7 km || 
|-id=048 bgcolor=#E9E9E9
| 117048 ||  || — || May 15, 2004 || Socorro || LINEAR || NEM || align=right | 4.3 km || 
|-id=049 bgcolor=#d6d6d6
| 117049 ||  || — || May 15, 2004 || Socorro || LINEAR || HYG || align=right | 5.2 km || 
|-id=050 bgcolor=#d6d6d6
| 117050 ||  || — || May 15, 2004 || Socorro || LINEAR || HYG || align=right | 5.2 km || 
|-id=051 bgcolor=#E9E9E9
| 117051 ||  || — || May 14, 2004 || Socorro || LINEAR || — || align=right | 6.5 km || 
|-id=052 bgcolor=#d6d6d6
| 117052 ||  || — || May 15, 2004 || Socorro || LINEAR || — || align=right | 4.2 km || 
|-id=053 bgcolor=#d6d6d6
| 117053 ||  || — || May 15, 2004 || Socorro || LINEAR || MEL || align=right | 5.8 km || 
|-id=054 bgcolor=#E9E9E9
| 117054 ||  || — || May 12, 2004 || Anderson Mesa || LONEOS || — || align=right | 3.6 km || 
|-id=055 bgcolor=#d6d6d6
| 117055 ||  || — || May 15, 2004 || Socorro || LINEAR || HYG || align=right | 5.5 km || 
|-id=056 bgcolor=#E9E9E9
| 117056 ||  || — || May 13, 2004 || Kitt Peak || Spacewatch || — || align=right | 1.8 km || 
|-id=057 bgcolor=#fefefe
| 117057 || 2004 KN || — || May 16, 2004 || Socorro || LINEAR || — || align=right | 5.0 km || 
|-id=058 bgcolor=#E9E9E9
| 117058 || 2004 KW || — || May 17, 2004 || Reedy Creek || J. Broughton || HNS || align=right | 3.3 km || 
|-id=059 bgcolor=#d6d6d6
| 117059 ||  || — || May 18, 2004 || Nashville || R. Clingan || — || align=right | 5.4 km || 
|-id=060 bgcolor=#d6d6d6
| 117060 ||  || — || May 16, 2004 || Socorro || LINEAR || — || align=right | 7.0 km || 
|-id=061 bgcolor=#d6d6d6
| 117061 ||  || — || May 16, 2004 || Socorro || LINEAR || — || align=right | 5.5 km || 
|-id=062 bgcolor=#d6d6d6
| 117062 ||  || — || May 16, 2004 || Socorro || LINEAR || — || align=right | 4.4 km || 
|-id=063 bgcolor=#d6d6d6
| 117063 ||  || — || May 18, 2004 || Socorro || LINEAR || HYG || align=right | 5.6 km || 
|-id=064 bgcolor=#fefefe
| 117064 ||  || — || May 16, 2004 || Socorro || LINEAR || V || align=right | 1.3 km || 
|-id=065 bgcolor=#d6d6d6
| 117065 ||  || — || May 18, 2004 || Socorro || LINEAR || — || align=right | 5.8 km || 
|-id=066 bgcolor=#d6d6d6
| 117066 ||  || — || May 19, 2004 || Socorro || LINEAR || HYG || align=right | 6.1 km || 
|-id=067 bgcolor=#E9E9E9
| 117067 ||  || — || May 17, 2004 || Socorro || LINEAR || — || align=right | 4.1 km || 
|-id=068 bgcolor=#E9E9E9
| 117068 ||  || — || May 22, 2004 || Catalina || CSS || — || align=right | 2.0 km || 
|-id=069 bgcolor=#E9E9E9
| 117069 ||  || — || May 17, 2004 || Bergisch Gladbach || W. Bickel || — || align=right | 2.9 km || 
|-id=070 bgcolor=#E9E9E9
| 117070 ||  || — || May 18, 2004 || Socorro || LINEAR || EUN || align=right | 1.9 km || 
|-id=071 bgcolor=#d6d6d6
| 117071 ||  || — || May 19, 2004 || Campo Imperatore || CINEOS || — || align=right | 3.1 km || 
|-id=072 bgcolor=#E9E9E9
| 117072 ||  || — || May 22, 2004 || Catalina || CSS || — || align=right | 2.0 km || 
|-id=073 bgcolor=#d6d6d6
| 117073 ||  || — || May 23, 2004 || Kitt Peak || Spacewatch || — || align=right | 5.5 km || 
|-id=074 bgcolor=#d6d6d6
| 117074 ||  || — || May 23, 2004 || Socorro || LINEAR || — || align=right | 5.2 km || 
|-id=075 bgcolor=#d6d6d6
| 117075 ||  || — || May 24, 2004 || Socorro || LINEAR || — || align=right | 5.8 km || 
|-id=076 bgcolor=#d6d6d6
| 117076 ||  || — || May 19, 2004 || Socorro || LINEAR || THM || align=right | 3.7 km || 
|-id=077 bgcolor=#E9E9E9
| 117077 ||  || — || June 5, 2004 || Palomar || NEAT || — || align=right | 2.6 km || 
|-id=078 bgcolor=#E9E9E9
| 117078 ||  || — || June 6, 2004 || Palomar || NEAT || — || align=right | 4.1 km || 
|-id=079 bgcolor=#E9E9E9
| 117079 ||  || — || June 11, 2004 || Anderson Mesa || LONEOS || MAR || align=right | 2.6 km || 
|-id=080 bgcolor=#E9E9E9
| 117080 ||  || — || June 13, 2004 || Kitt Peak || Spacewatch || EUN || align=right | 2.6 km || 
|-id=081 bgcolor=#d6d6d6
| 117081 ||  || — || June 10, 2004 || Campo Imperatore || CINEOS || — || align=right | 5.9 km || 
|-id=082 bgcolor=#fefefe
| 117082 ||  || — || June 11, 2004 || Catalina || CSS || — || align=right | 1.9 km || 
|-id=083 bgcolor=#E9E9E9
| 117083 ||  || — || June 12, 2004 || Catalina || CSS || CLO || align=right | 4.1 km || 
|-id=084 bgcolor=#fefefe
| 117084 ||  || — || June 14, 2004 || Socorro || LINEAR || — || align=right | 2.1 km || 
|-id=085 bgcolor=#fefefe
| 117085 ||  || — || June 14, 2004 || Socorro || LINEAR || — || align=right | 3.6 km || 
|-id=086 bgcolor=#d6d6d6
| 117086 Lóczy ||  ||  || June 8, 2004 || Piszkéstető || K. Sárneczky, G. Szabó || — || align=right | 6.1 km || 
|-id=087 bgcolor=#E9E9E9
| 117087 ||  || — || June 13, 2004 || Kitt Peak || Spacewatch || — || align=right | 3.5 km || 
|-id=088 bgcolor=#fefefe
| 117088 ||  || — || June 13, 2004 || Socorro || LINEAR || — || align=right | 2.3 km || 
|-id=089 bgcolor=#E9E9E9
| 117089 ||  || — || June 12, 2004 || Catalina || CSS || JUN || align=right | 1.9 km || 
|-id=090 bgcolor=#E9E9E9
| 117090 ||  || — || June 16, 2004 || Socorro || LINEAR || — || align=right | 2.8 km || 
|-id=091 bgcolor=#fefefe
| 117091 ||  || — || July 11, 2004 || Socorro || LINEAR || — || align=right | 4.9 km || 
|-id=092 bgcolor=#fefefe
| 117092 ||  || — || July 11, 2004 || Socorro || LINEAR || V || align=right | 2.2 km || 
|-id=093 bgcolor=#E9E9E9
| 117093 Umbria ||  ||  || July 12, 2004 || Vallemare di Borbona || V. S. Casulli || — || align=right | 1.9 km || 
|-id=094 bgcolor=#d6d6d6
| 117094 ||  || — || July 11, 2004 || Socorro || LINEAR || — || align=right | 5.6 km || 
|-id=095 bgcolor=#E9E9E9
| 117095 ||  || — || July 12, 2004 || Palomar || NEAT || — || align=right | 3.1 km || 
|-id=096 bgcolor=#fefefe
| 117096 ||  || — || July 15, 2004 || Socorro || LINEAR || — || align=right | 2.0 km || 
|-id=097 bgcolor=#d6d6d6
| 117097 ||  || — || July 11, 2004 || Socorro || LINEAR || HYG || align=right | 5.7 km || 
|-id=098 bgcolor=#d6d6d6
| 117098 ||  || — || July 15, 2004 || Socorro || LINEAR || — || align=right | 7.5 km || 
|-id=099 bgcolor=#d6d6d6
| 117099 ||  || — || July 11, 2004 || Socorro || LINEAR || — || align=right | 6.6 km || 
|-id=100 bgcolor=#fefefe
| 117100 ||  || — || July 14, 2004 || Siding Spring || SSS || — || align=right | 2.5 km || 
|}

117101–117200 

|-bgcolor=#fefefe
| 117101 ||  || — || July 16, 2004 || Socorro || LINEAR || — || align=right | 2.5 km || 
|-id=102 bgcolor=#d6d6d6
| 117102 ||  || — || July 16, 2004 || Socorro || LINEAR || 3:2 || align=right | 12 km || 
|-id=103 bgcolor=#d6d6d6
| 117103 ||  || — || July 16, 2004 || Socorro || LINEAR || KOR || align=right | 2.9 km || 
|-id=104 bgcolor=#fefefe
| 117104 ||  || — || July 17, 2004 || Socorro || LINEAR || — || align=right | 1.5 km || 
|-id=105 bgcolor=#fefefe
| 117105 ||  || — || July 16, 2004 || Socorro || LINEAR || — || align=right | 1.7 km || 
|-id=106 bgcolor=#d6d6d6
| 117106 ||  || — || July 16, 2004 || Socorro || LINEAR || 3:2 || align=right | 5.9 km || 
|-id=107 bgcolor=#E9E9E9
| 117107 ||  || — || July 21, 2004 || Reedy Creek || J. Broughton || — || align=right | 3.9 km || 
|-id=108 bgcolor=#d6d6d6
| 117108 ||  || — || August 6, 2004 || Reedy Creek || J. Broughton || 3:2 || align=right | 9.1 km || 
|-id=109 bgcolor=#fefefe
| 117109 ||  || — || August 3, 2004 || Siding Spring || SSS || MAS || align=right | 1.5 km || 
|-id=110 bgcolor=#fefefe
| 117110 ||  || — || August 6, 2004 || Palomar || NEAT || — || align=right | 2.0 km || 
|-id=111 bgcolor=#d6d6d6
| 117111 ||  || — || August 6, 2004 || Palomar || NEAT || EOS || align=right | 3.5 km || 
|-id=112 bgcolor=#d6d6d6
| 117112 ||  || — || August 6, 2004 || Palomar || NEAT || HYG || align=right | 5.9 km || 
|-id=113 bgcolor=#d6d6d6
| 117113 ||  || — || August 7, 2004 || Palomar || NEAT || HIL3:2 || align=right | 9.9 km || 
|-id=114 bgcolor=#fefefe
| 117114 ||  || — || August 7, 2004 || Palomar || NEAT || MAS || align=right | 1.4 km || 
|-id=115 bgcolor=#d6d6d6
| 117115 ||  || — || August 7, 2004 || Palomar || NEAT || — || align=right | 5.1 km || 
|-id=116 bgcolor=#E9E9E9
| 117116 ||  || — || August 7, 2004 || Palomar || NEAT || — || align=right | 2.8 km || 
|-id=117 bgcolor=#fefefe
| 117117 ||  || — || August 7, 2004 || Palomar || NEAT || V || align=right | 1.4 km || 
|-id=118 bgcolor=#d6d6d6
| 117118 ||  || — || August 8, 2004 || Anderson Mesa || LONEOS || — || align=right | 4.5 km || 
|-id=119 bgcolor=#E9E9E9
| 117119 ||  || — || August 7, 2004 || Palomar || NEAT || — || align=right | 3.6 km || 
|-id=120 bgcolor=#E9E9E9
| 117120 ||  || — || August 7, 2004 || Palomar || NEAT || — || align=right | 2.9 km || 
|-id=121 bgcolor=#d6d6d6
| 117121 ||  || — || August 8, 2004 || Socorro || LINEAR || — || align=right | 6.0 km || 
|-id=122 bgcolor=#E9E9E9
| 117122 ||  || — || August 8, 2004 || Anderson Mesa || LONEOS || — || align=right | 3.7 km || 
|-id=123 bgcolor=#d6d6d6
| 117123 ||  || — || August 8, 2004 || Campo Imperatore || CINEOS || 628 || align=right | 3.3 km || 
|-id=124 bgcolor=#fefefe
| 117124 ||  || — || August 9, 2004 || Socorro || LINEAR || NYS || align=right | 1.5 km || 
|-id=125 bgcolor=#fefefe
| 117125 ||  || — || August 9, 2004 || Socorro || LINEAR || FLO || align=right | 1.4 km || 
|-id=126 bgcolor=#E9E9E9
| 117126 ||  || — || August 9, 2004 || Anderson Mesa || LONEOS || XIZ || align=right | 2.6 km || 
|-id=127 bgcolor=#d6d6d6
| 117127 ||  || — || August 9, 2004 || Socorro || LINEAR || — || align=right | 3.1 km || 
|-id=128 bgcolor=#d6d6d6
| 117128 ||  || — || August 8, 2004 || Socorro || LINEAR || — || align=right | 3.4 km || 
|-id=129 bgcolor=#d6d6d6
| 117129 ||  || — || August 8, 2004 || Socorro || LINEAR || — || align=right | 6.1 km || 
|-id=130 bgcolor=#fefefe
| 117130 ||  || — || August 9, 2004 || Socorro || LINEAR || NYS || align=right | 1.3 km || 
|-id=131 bgcolor=#d6d6d6
| 117131 ||  || — || August 9, 2004 || Socorro || LINEAR || HIL3:2 || align=right | 12 km || 
|-id=132 bgcolor=#E9E9E9
| 117132 ||  || — || August 9, 2004 || Socorro || LINEAR || MRX || align=right | 1.9 km || 
|-id=133 bgcolor=#E9E9E9
| 117133 ||  || — || August 10, 2004 || Socorro || LINEAR || — || align=right | 1.8 km || 
|-id=134 bgcolor=#fefefe
| 117134 ||  || — || August 7, 2004 || Palomar || NEAT || V || align=right | 1.5 km || 
|-id=135 bgcolor=#d6d6d6
| 117135 ||  || — || August 9, 2004 || Anderson Mesa || LONEOS || EUP || align=right | 8.4 km || 
|-id=136 bgcolor=#d6d6d6
| 117136 ||  || — || August 9, 2004 || Socorro || LINEAR || — || align=right | 7.6 km || 
|-id=137 bgcolor=#E9E9E9
| 117137 ||  || — || August 10, 2004 || Socorro || LINEAR || — || align=right | 3.8 km || 
|-id=138 bgcolor=#fefefe
| 117138 ||  || — || August 10, 2004 || Socorro || LINEAR || NYS || align=right | 1.5 km || 
|-id=139 bgcolor=#fefefe
| 117139 ||  || — || August 10, 2004 || Socorro || LINEAR || — || align=right | 1.9 km || 
|-id=140 bgcolor=#E9E9E9
| 117140 ||  || — || August 8, 2004 || Anderson Mesa || LONEOS || — || align=right | 2.4 km || 
|-id=141 bgcolor=#fefefe
| 117141 ||  || — || August 8, 2004 || Anderson Mesa || LONEOS || FLO || align=right | 1.1 km || 
|-id=142 bgcolor=#d6d6d6
| 117142 ||  || — || August 9, 2004 || Socorro || LINEAR || — || align=right | 5.0 km || 
|-id=143 bgcolor=#fefefe
| 117143 ||  || — || August 10, 2004 || Socorro || LINEAR || — || align=right | 2.0 km || 
|-id=144 bgcolor=#fefefe
| 117144 ||  || — || August 10, 2004 || Socorro || LINEAR || — || align=right | 1.7 km || 
|-id=145 bgcolor=#fefefe
| 117145 ||  || — || August 10, 2004 || Socorro || LINEAR || — || align=right | 1.6 km || 
|-id=146 bgcolor=#E9E9E9
| 117146 ||  || — || August 10, 2004 || Socorro || LINEAR || — || align=right | 5.9 km || 
|-id=147 bgcolor=#d6d6d6
| 117147 ||  || — || August 14, 2004 || Reedy Creek || J. Broughton || — || align=right | 5.3 km || 
|-id=148 bgcolor=#fefefe
| 117148 ||  || — || August 10, 2004 || Socorro || LINEAR || V || align=right | 1.4 km || 
|-id=149 bgcolor=#E9E9E9
| 117149 ||  || — || August 12, 2004 || Socorro || LINEAR || — || align=right | 5.7 km || 
|-id=150 bgcolor=#d6d6d6
| 117150 ||  || — || August 12, 2004 || Socorro || LINEAR || — || align=right | 4.1 km || 
|-id=151 bgcolor=#d6d6d6
| 117151 ||  || — || August 12, 2004 || Siding Spring || SSS || EOS || align=right | 4.3 km || 
|-id=152 bgcolor=#d6d6d6
| 117152 ||  || — || August 16, 2004 || Siding Spring || SSS || — || align=right | 9.9 km || 
|-id=153 bgcolor=#E9E9E9
| 117153 ||  || — || August 19, 2004 || Siding Spring || SSS || — || align=right | 1.8 km || 
|-id=154 bgcolor=#d6d6d6
| 117154 ||  || — || August 19, 2004 || Siding Spring || SSS || — || align=right | 7.5 km || 
|-id=155 bgcolor=#E9E9E9
| 117155 ||  || — || August 17, 2004 || Socorro || LINEAR || — || align=right | 2.8 km || 
|-id=156 bgcolor=#E9E9E9
| 117156 Altschwendt ||  ||  || August 23, 2004 || Altschwendt || W. Ries || — || align=right | 2.3 km || 
|-id=157 bgcolor=#fefefe
| 117157 ||  || — || August 21, 2004 || Siding Spring || SSS || V || align=right | 1.6 km || 
|-id=158 bgcolor=#E9E9E9
| 117158 ||  || — || August 21, 2004 || Siding Spring || SSS || — || align=right | 2.7 km || 
|-id=159 bgcolor=#d6d6d6
| 117159 ||  || — || August 21, 2004 || Siding Spring || SSS || — || align=right | 4.8 km || 
|-id=160 bgcolor=#E9E9E9
| 117160 ||  || — || August 19, 2004 || Socorro || LINEAR || ADE || align=right | 5.3 km || 
|-id=161 bgcolor=#d6d6d6
| 117161 ||  || — || August 19, 2004 || Socorro || LINEAR || — || align=right | 3.4 km || 
|-id=162 bgcolor=#d6d6d6
| 117162 ||  || — || August 21, 2004 || Goodricke-Pigott || Goodricke-Pigott Obs. || — || align=right | 8.5 km || 
|-id=163 bgcolor=#E9E9E9
| 117163 ||  || — || August 22, 2004 || Goodricke-Pigott || Goodricke-Pigott Obs. || IAN || align=right | 1.9 km || 
|-id=164 bgcolor=#d6d6d6
| 117164 ||  || — || September 6, 2004 || Socorro || LINEAR || ALA || align=right | 7.0 km || 
|-id=165 bgcolor=#E9E9E9
| 117165 ||  || — || September 4, 2004 || Palomar || NEAT || — || align=right | 3.7 km || 
|-id=166 bgcolor=#d6d6d6
| 117166 ||  || — || September 5, 2004 || Palomar || NEAT || — || align=right | 6.8 km || 
|-id=167 bgcolor=#E9E9E9
| 117167 ||  || — || September 8, 2004 || Socorro || LINEAR || GEF || align=right | 1.9 km || 
|-id=168 bgcolor=#E9E9E9
| 117168 ||  || — || September 7, 2004 || Socorro || LINEAR || AEO || align=right | 2.9 km || 
|-id=169 bgcolor=#d6d6d6
| 117169 ||  || — || September 7, 2004 || Socorro || LINEAR || EOS || align=right | 3.2 km || 
|-id=170 bgcolor=#E9E9E9
| 117170 ||  || — || September 7, 2004 || Socorro || LINEAR || — || align=right | 3.6 km || 
|-id=171 bgcolor=#d6d6d6
| 117171 ||  || — || September 8, 2004 || Socorro || LINEAR || — || align=right | 4.0 km || 
|-id=172 bgcolor=#fefefe
| 117172 ||  || — || September 8, 2004 || Socorro || LINEAR || — || align=right | 1.5 km || 
|-id=173 bgcolor=#E9E9E9
| 117173 ||  || — || September 8, 2004 || Socorro || LINEAR || AGN || align=right | 2.7 km || 
|-id=174 bgcolor=#d6d6d6
| 117174 ||  || — || September 8, 2004 || Socorro || LINEAR || — || align=right | 8.6 km || 
|-id=175 bgcolor=#E9E9E9
| 117175 ||  || — || September 8, 2004 || Socorro || LINEAR || AGN || align=right | 2.8 km || 
|-id=176 bgcolor=#d6d6d6
| 117176 ||  || — || September 8, 2004 || Socorro || LINEAR || — || align=right | 5.6 km || 
|-id=177 bgcolor=#E9E9E9
| 117177 ||  || — || September 8, 2004 || Socorro || LINEAR || — || align=right | 2.4 km || 
|-id=178 bgcolor=#d6d6d6
| 117178 ||  || — || September 8, 2004 || Socorro || LINEAR || — || align=right | 4.3 km || 
|-id=179 bgcolor=#fefefe
| 117179 ||  || — || September 8, 2004 || Socorro || LINEAR || — || align=right | 1.8 km || 
|-id=180 bgcolor=#E9E9E9
| 117180 ||  || — || September 8, 2004 || Socorro || LINEAR || WIT || align=right | 1.9 km || 
|-id=181 bgcolor=#d6d6d6
| 117181 ||  || — || September 8, 2004 || Socorro || LINEAR || ALA || align=right | 5.1 km || 
|-id=182 bgcolor=#fefefe
| 117182 ||  || — || September 8, 2004 || Palomar || NEAT || NYS || align=right | 1.2 km || 
|-id=183 bgcolor=#fefefe
| 117183 ||  || — || September 8, 2004 || Palomar || NEAT || KLI || align=right | 4.1 km || 
|-id=184 bgcolor=#d6d6d6
| 117184 ||  || — || September 8, 2004 || Palomar || NEAT || — || align=right | 4.7 km || 
|-id=185 bgcolor=#E9E9E9
| 117185 ||  || — || September 8, 2004 || Socorro || LINEAR || — || align=right | 2.6 km || 
|-id=186 bgcolor=#fefefe
| 117186 ||  || — || September 8, 2004 || Socorro || LINEAR || V || align=right | 1.3 km || 
|-id=187 bgcolor=#fefefe
| 117187 ||  || — || September 8, 2004 || Socorro || LINEAR || NYS || align=right | 1.1 km || 
|-id=188 bgcolor=#d6d6d6
| 117188 ||  || — || September 7, 2004 || Palomar || NEAT || — || align=right | 8.7 km || 
|-id=189 bgcolor=#d6d6d6
| 117189 ||  || — || September 8, 2004 || Socorro || LINEAR || — || align=right | 6.4 km || 
|-id=190 bgcolor=#E9E9E9
| 117190 ||  || — || September 8, 2004 || Palomar || NEAT || — || align=right | 4.0 km || 
|-id=191 bgcolor=#d6d6d6
| 117191 ||  || — || September 8, 2004 || Socorro || LINEAR || ALA || align=right | 7.2 km || 
|-id=192 bgcolor=#E9E9E9
| 117192 ||  || — || September 8, 2004 || Socorro || LINEAR || — || align=right | 5.1 km || 
|-id=193 bgcolor=#E9E9E9
| 117193 ||  || — || September 9, 2004 || Socorro || LINEAR || — || align=right | 3.2 km || 
|-id=194 bgcolor=#fefefe
| 117194 ||  || — || September 10, 2004 || Socorro || LINEAR || V || align=right | 1.2 km || 
|-id=195 bgcolor=#fefefe
| 117195 ||  || — || September 10, 2004 || Socorro || LINEAR || — || align=right | 1.1 km || 
|-id=196 bgcolor=#d6d6d6
| 117196 ||  || — || September 11, 2004 || Socorro || LINEAR || — || align=right | 6.7 km || 
|-id=197 bgcolor=#fefefe
| 117197 ||  || — || September 9, 2004 || Socorro || LINEAR || V || align=right | 1.5 km || 
|-id=198 bgcolor=#E9E9E9
| 117198 ||  || — || September 9, 2004 || Socorro || LINEAR || — || align=right | 2.5 km || 
|-id=199 bgcolor=#fefefe
| 117199 ||  || — || September 9, 2004 || Socorro || LINEAR || FLO || align=right | 1.2 km || 
|-id=200 bgcolor=#d6d6d6
| 117200 ||  || — || September 10, 2004 || Socorro || LINEAR || 3:2 || align=right | 10 km || 
|}

117201–117300 

|-bgcolor=#E9E9E9
| 117201 ||  || — || September 10, 2004 || Socorro || LINEAR || — || align=right | 2.6 km || 
|-id=202 bgcolor=#fefefe
| 117202 ||  || — || September 10, 2004 || Socorro || LINEAR || V || align=right | 1.5 km || 
|-id=203 bgcolor=#d6d6d6
| 117203 ||  || — || September 10, 2004 || Socorro || LINEAR || — || align=right | 4.6 km || 
|-id=204 bgcolor=#d6d6d6
| 117204 ||  || — || September 10, 2004 || Socorro || LINEAR || — || align=right | 7.1 km || 
|-id=205 bgcolor=#d6d6d6
| 117205 ||  || — || September 10, 2004 || Socorro || LINEAR || EOS || align=right | 5.0 km || 
|-id=206 bgcolor=#E9E9E9
| 117206 ||  || — || September 10, 2004 || Socorro || LINEAR || EUN || align=right | 2.0 km || 
|-id=207 bgcolor=#d6d6d6
| 117207 ||  || — || September 10, 2004 || Socorro || LINEAR || EOS || align=right | 4.4 km || 
|-id=208 bgcolor=#d6d6d6
| 117208 ||  || — || September 10, 2004 || Socorro || LINEAR || — || align=right | 7.7 km || 
|-id=209 bgcolor=#E9E9E9
| 117209 ||  || — || September 10, 2004 || Socorro || LINEAR || MAR || align=right | 2.2 km || 
|-id=210 bgcolor=#d6d6d6
| 117210 ||  || — || September 10, 2004 || Socorro || LINEAR || — || align=right | 7.2 km || 
|-id=211 bgcolor=#E9E9E9
| 117211 ||  || — || September 8, 2004 || Socorro || LINEAR || PAE || align=right | 4.2 km || 
|-id=212 bgcolor=#d6d6d6
| 117212 ||  || — || September 11, 2004 || Socorro || LINEAR || — || align=right | 3.8 km || 
|-id=213 bgcolor=#d6d6d6
| 117213 ||  || — || September 11, 2004 || Socorro || LINEAR || THB || align=right | 4.5 km || 
|-id=214 bgcolor=#E9E9E9
| 117214 ||  || — || September 11, 2004 || Socorro || LINEAR || — || align=right | 5.0 km || 
|-id=215 bgcolor=#E9E9E9
| 117215 ||  || — || September 8, 2004 || Palomar || NEAT || — || align=right | 4.6 km || 
|-id=216 bgcolor=#E9E9E9
| 117216 ||  || — || September 10, 2004 || Socorro || LINEAR || — || align=right | 3.5 km || 
|-id=217 bgcolor=#E9E9E9
| 117217 ||  || — || September 6, 2004 || Palomar || NEAT || — || align=right | 3.0 km || 
|-id=218 bgcolor=#d6d6d6
| 117218 ||  || — || September 6, 2004 || Palomar || NEAT || — || align=right | 7.0 km || 
|-id=219 bgcolor=#d6d6d6
| 117219 ||  || — || September 10, 2004 || Socorro || LINEAR || — || align=right | 9.1 km || 
|-id=220 bgcolor=#E9E9E9
| 117220 ||  || — || September 12, 2004 || Socorro || LINEAR || — || align=right | 5.1 km || 
|-id=221 bgcolor=#fefefe
| 117221 ||  || — || September 13, 2004 || Socorro || LINEAR || — || align=right | 2.6 km || 
|-id=222 bgcolor=#E9E9E9
| 117222 ||  || — || September 13, 2004 || Socorro || LINEAR || MRX || align=right | 2.0 km || 
|-id=223 bgcolor=#E9E9E9
| 117223 ||  || — || September 14, 2004 || Palomar || NEAT || — || align=right | 2.0 km || 
|-id=224 bgcolor=#d6d6d6
| 117224 ||  || — || September 13, 2004 || Socorro || LINEAR || LUT || align=right | 10 km || 
|-id=225 bgcolor=#fefefe
| 117225 ||  || — || September 13, 2004 || Socorro || LINEAR || H || align=right | 1.2 km || 
|-id=226 bgcolor=#fefefe
| 117226 ||  || — || September 13, 2004 || Socorro || LINEAR || — || align=right | 2.8 km || 
|-id=227 bgcolor=#d6d6d6
| 117227 ||  || — || September 13, 2004 || Socorro || LINEAR || — || align=right | 7.2 km || 
|-id=228 bgcolor=#E9E9E9
| 117228 ||  || — || September 15, 2004 || Anderson Mesa || LONEOS || — || align=right | 1.6 km || 
|-id=229 bgcolor=#d6d6d6
| 117229 ||  || — || September 15, 2004 || Kitt Peak || Spacewatch || — || align=right | 5.7 km || 
|-id=230 bgcolor=#fefefe
| 117230 ||  || — || September 15, 2004 || Kitt Peak || Spacewatch || NYS || align=right | 1.6 km || 
|-id=231 bgcolor=#fefefe
| 117231 ||  || — || September 9, 2004 || Socorro || LINEAR || — || align=right | 1.1 km || 
|-id=232 bgcolor=#E9E9E9
| 117232 ||  || — || September 16, 2004 || Kitt Peak || Spacewatch || — || align=right | 3.9 km || 
|-id=233 bgcolor=#E9E9E9
| 117233 ||  || — || September 16, 2004 || Socorro || LINEAR || BRU || align=right | 6.9 km || 
|-id=234 bgcolor=#E9E9E9
| 117234 ||  || — || September 16, 2004 || Siding Spring || SSS || — || align=right | 1.9 km || 
|-id=235 bgcolor=#d6d6d6
| 117235 ||  || — || September 17, 2004 || Socorro || LINEAR || EUP || align=right | 8.6 km || 
|-id=236 bgcolor=#fefefe
| 117236 ||  || — || September 17, 2004 || Anderson Mesa || LONEOS || V || align=right | 1.4 km || 
|-id=237 bgcolor=#fefefe
| 117237 ||  || — || September 17, 2004 || Anderson Mesa || LONEOS || — || align=right | 1.7 km || 
|-id=238 bgcolor=#E9E9E9
| 117238 ||  || — || September 17, 2004 || Anderson Mesa || LONEOS || — || align=right | 2.8 km || 
|-id=239 bgcolor=#d6d6d6
| 117239 ||  || — || September 17, 2004 || Kitt Peak || Spacewatch || HYG || align=right | 6.0 km || 
|-id=240 bgcolor=#E9E9E9
| 117240 Zhytomyr ||  ||  || September 19, 2004 || Andrushivka || Andrushivka Obs. || — || align=right | 3.9 km || 
|-id=241 bgcolor=#fefefe
| 117241 ||  || — || September 17, 2004 || Desert Eagle || W. K. Y. Yeung || MAS || align=right | 1.2 km || 
|-id=242 bgcolor=#E9E9E9
| 117242 ||  || — || September 21, 2004 || Socorro || LINEAR || BRU || align=right | 5.9 km || 
|-id=243 bgcolor=#d6d6d6
| 117243 ||  || — || September 22, 2004 || Desert Eagle || W. K. Y. Yeung || SYL7:4 || align=right | 9.1 km || 
|-id=244 bgcolor=#fefefe
| 117244 ||  || — || September 17, 2004 || Socorro || LINEAR || — || align=right | 1.5 km || 
|-id=245 bgcolor=#d6d6d6
| 117245 ||  || — || September 17, 2004 || Socorro || LINEAR || — || align=right | 3.8 km || 
|-id=246 bgcolor=#fefefe
| 117246 ||  || — || September 17, 2004 || Socorro || LINEAR || FLO || align=right | 1.2 km || 
|-id=247 bgcolor=#fefefe
| 117247 ||  || — || September 17, 2004 || Socorro || LINEAR || V || align=right | 1.3 km || 
|-id=248 bgcolor=#E9E9E9
| 117248 ||  || — || September 17, 2004 || Socorro || LINEAR || EUN || align=right | 2.5 km || 
|-id=249 bgcolor=#d6d6d6
| 117249 ||  || — || September 17, 2004 || Socorro || LINEAR || — || align=right | 5.6 km || 
|-id=250 bgcolor=#fefefe
| 117250 ||  || — || September 17, 2004 || Socorro || LINEAR || H || align=right data-sort-value="0.89" | 890 m || 
|-id=251 bgcolor=#E9E9E9
| 117251 ||  || — || September 17, 2004 || Kitt Peak || Spacewatch || MAR || align=right | 2.3 km || 
|-id=252 bgcolor=#E9E9E9
| 117252 ||  || — || September 17, 2004 || Kitt Peak || Spacewatch || — || align=right | 3.7 km || 
|-id=253 bgcolor=#E9E9E9
| 117253 ||  || — || September 18, 2004 || Socorro || LINEAR || — || align=right | 5.3 km || 
|-id=254 bgcolor=#d6d6d6
| 117254 ||  || — || September 18, 2004 || Socorro || LINEAR || — || align=right | 6.1 km || 
|-id=255 bgcolor=#E9E9E9
| 117255 ||  || — || September 18, 2004 || Socorro || LINEAR || — || align=right | 3.3 km || 
|-id=256 bgcolor=#d6d6d6
| 117256 ||  || — || September 22, 2004 || Socorro || LINEAR || EOS || align=right | 4.0 km || 
|-id=257 bgcolor=#d6d6d6
| 117257 ||  || — || September 22, 2004 || Socorro || LINEAR || — || align=right | 6.6 km || 
|-id=258 bgcolor=#E9E9E9
| 117258 ||  || — || September 22, 2004 || Socorro || LINEAR || GEF || align=right | 3.5 km || 
|-id=259 bgcolor=#E9E9E9
| 117259 ||  || — || September 22, 2004 || Socorro || LINEAR || EUN || align=right | 3.3 km || 
|-id=260 bgcolor=#E9E9E9
| 117260 ||  || — || September 22, 2004 || Socorro || LINEAR || — || align=right | 2.9 km || 
|-id=261 bgcolor=#d6d6d6
| 117261 ||  || — || September 16, 2004 || Anderson Mesa || LONEOS || — || align=right | 6.1 km || 
|-id=262 bgcolor=#fefefe
| 117262 ||  || — || September 16, 2004 || Anderson Mesa || LONEOS || — || align=right | 1.5 km || 
|-id=263 bgcolor=#fefefe
| 117263 ||  || — || September 16, 2004 || Anderson Mesa || LONEOS || — || align=right | 1.8 km || 
|-id=264 bgcolor=#fefefe
| 117264 ||  || — || September 22, 2004 || Socorro || LINEAR || — || align=right | 1.7 km || 
|-id=265 bgcolor=#d6d6d6
| 117265 ||  || — || October 4, 2004 || Goodricke-Pigott || R. A. Tucker || THM || align=right | 5.9 km || 
|-id=266 bgcolor=#E9E9E9
| 117266 ||  || — || October 5, 2004 || Socorro || LINEAR || — || align=right | 4.9 km || 
|-id=267 bgcolor=#d6d6d6
| 117267 ||  || — || October 6, 2004 || Socorro || LINEAR || Tj (2.95) || align=right | 8.8 km || 
|-id=268 bgcolor=#d6d6d6
| 117268 ||  || — || October 4, 2004 || Kitt Peak || Spacewatch || — || align=right | 8.0 km || 
|-id=269 bgcolor=#d6d6d6
| 117269 ||  || — || October 4, 2004 || Kitt Peak || Spacewatch || — || align=right | 3.7 km || 
|-id=270 bgcolor=#d6d6d6
| 117270 ||  || — || October 6, 2004 || Socorro || LINEAR || THB || align=right | 7.1 km || 
|-id=271 bgcolor=#d6d6d6
| 117271 ||  || — || October 6, 2004 || Palomar || NEAT || — || align=right | 6.1 km || 
|-id=272 bgcolor=#E9E9E9
| 117272 ||  || — || October 7, 2004 || Socorro || LINEAR || — || align=right | 4.8 km || 
|-id=273 bgcolor=#d6d6d6
| 117273 ||  || — || October 7, 2004 || Socorro || LINEAR || — || align=right | 5.8 km || 
|-id=274 bgcolor=#E9E9E9
| 117274 ||  || — || October 7, 2004 || Anderson Mesa || LONEOS || MRX || align=right | 2.1 km || 
|-id=275 bgcolor=#E9E9E9
| 117275 ||  || — || October 7, 2004 || Palomar || NEAT || GEF || align=right | 2.6 km || 
|-id=276 bgcolor=#fefefe
| 117276 ||  || — || October 5, 2004 || Palomar || NEAT || NYS || align=right | 1.3 km || 
|-id=277 bgcolor=#fefefe
| 117277 ||  || — || October 6, 2004 || Socorro || LINEAR || V || align=right | 1.2 km || 
|-id=278 bgcolor=#d6d6d6
| 117278 ||  || — || October 6, 2004 || Siding Spring || SSS || — || align=right | 7.9 km || 
|-id=279 bgcolor=#fefefe
| 117279 ||  || — || October 7, 2004 || Anderson Mesa || LONEOS || — || align=right | 1.4 km || 
|-id=280 bgcolor=#E9E9E9
| 117280 ||  || — || October 7, 2004 || Anderson Mesa || LONEOS || — || align=right | 3.3 km || 
|-id=281 bgcolor=#d6d6d6
| 117281 ||  || — || October 7, 2004 || Anderson Mesa || LONEOS || — || align=right | 4.4 km || 
|-id=282 bgcolor=#E9E9E9
| 117282 ||  || — || October 9, 2004 || Anderson Mesa || LONEOS || — || align=right | 4.2 km || 
|-id=283 bgcolor=#d6d6d6
| 117283 ||  || — || October 7, 2004 || Socorro || LINEAR || — || align=right | 5.4 km || 
|-id=284 bgcolor=#E9E9E9
| 117284 ||  || — || October 7, 2004 || Socorro || LINEAR || MIS || align=right | 5.5 km || 
|-id=285 bgcolor=#d6d6d6
| 117285 ||  || — || October 8, 2004 || Socorro || LINEAR || — || align=right | 4.8 km || 
|-id=286 bgcolor=#E9E9E9
| 117286 ||  || — || October 7, 2004 || Kitt Peak || Spacewatch || — || align=right | 4.4 km || 
|-id=287 bgcolor=#E9E9E9
| 117287 ||  || — || October 7, 2004 || Socorro || LINEAR || — || align=right | 3.4 km || 
|-id=288 bgcolor=#d6d6d6
| 117288 ||  || — || October 7, 2004 || Socorro || LINEAR || HIL3:2 || align=right | 15 km || 
|-id=289 bgcolor=#E9E9E9
| 117289 ||  || — || October 10, 2004 || Socorro || LINEAR || — || align=right | 4.6 km || 
|-id=290 bgcolor=#E9E9E9
| 117290 ||  || — || October 7, 2004 || Socorro || LINEAR || EUN || align=right | 2.3 km || 
|-id=291 bgcolor=#fefefe
| 117291 ||  || — || October 9, 2004 || Kitt Peak || Spacewatch || NYS || align=right | 3.1 km || 
|-id=292 bgcolor=#E9E9E9
| 117292 ||  || — || October 9, 2004 || Socorro || LINEAR || — || align=right | 3.3 km || 
|-id=293 bgcolor=#E9E9E9
| 117293 ||  || — || October 4, 2004 || Palomar || NEAT || MAR || align=right | 1.9 km || 
|-id=294 bgcolor=#d6d6d6
| 117294 ||  || — || October 12, 2004 || Anderson Mesa || LONEOS || — || align=right | 5.7 km || 
|-id=295 bgcolor=#E9E9E9
| 117295 ||  || — || October 7, 2004 || Socorro || LINEAR || — || align=right | 3.4 km || 
|-id=296 bgcolor=#E9E9E9
| 117296 ||  || — || October 21, 2004 || Socorro || LINEAR || GEF || align=right | 2.2 km || 
|-id=297 bgcolor=#d6d6d6
| 117297 ||  || — || October 21, 2004 || Socorro || LINEAR || EOS || align=right | 3.8 km || 
|-id=298 bgcolor=#fefefe
| 117298 ||  || — || October 20, 2004 || Socorro || LINEAR || — || align=right | 1.4 km || 
|-id=299 bgcolor=#fefefe
| 117299 ||  || — || October 19, 2004 || Socorro || LINEAR || — || align=right | 1.6 km || 
|-id=300 bgcolor=#d6d6d6
| 117300 ||  || — || November 2, 2004 || Anderson Mesa || LONEOS || — || align=right | 6.5 km || 
|}

117301–117400 

|-bgcolor=#fefefe
| 117301 ||  || — || November 3, 2004 || Anderson Mesa || LONEOS || — || align=right | 1.1 km || 
|-id=302 bgcolor=#d6d6d6
| 117302 ||  || — || November 3, 2004 || Anderson Mesa || LONEOS || — || align=right | 7.1 km || 
|-id=303 bgcolor=#E9E9E9
| 117303 ||  || — || November 3, 2004 || Anderson Mesa || LONEOS || — || align=right | 5.7 km || 
|-id=304 bgcolor=#d6d6d6
| 117304 ||  || — || November 3, 2004 || Catalina || CSS || — || align=right | 3.9 km || 
|-id=305 bgcolor=#d6d6d6
| 117305 ||  || — || November 1, 2004 || Palomar || NEAT || EOS || align=right | 3.3 km || 
|-id=306 bgcolor=#fefefe
| 117306 ||  || — || November 4, 2004 || Catalina || CSS || — || align=right | 1.4 km || 
|-id=307 bgcolor=#d6d6d6
| 117307 ||  || — || November 4, 2004 || Catalina || CSS || — || align=right | 8.0 km || 
|-id=308 bgcolor=#E9E9E9
| 117308 ||  || — || November 4, 2004 || Catalina || CSS || — || align=right | 2.8 km || 
|-id=309 bgcolor=#d6d6d6
| 117309 ||  || — || November 4, 2004 || Catalina || CSS || KOR || align=right | 2.8 km || 
|-id=310 bgcolor=#d6d6d6
| 117310 ||  || — || November 5, 2004 || Campo Imperatore || CINEOS || — || align=right | 6.2 km || 
|-id=311 bgcolor=#d6d6d6
| 117311 ||  || — || November 5, 2004 || Campo Imperatore || CINEOS || — || align=right | 5.4 km || 
|-id=312 bgcolor=#E9E9E9
| 117312 ||  || — || November 3, 2004 || Anderson Mesa || LONEOS || — || align=right | 5.0 km || 
|-id=313 bgcolor=#fefefe
| 117313 ||  || — || November 4, 2004 || Catalina || CSS || — || align=right | 1.3 km || 
|-id=314 bgcolor=#d6d6d6
| 117314 ||  || — || November 4, 2004 || Kitt Peak || Spacewatch || — || align=right | 3.4 km || 
|-id=315 bgcolor=#d6d6d6
| 117315 ||  || — || November 4, 2004 || Anderson Mesa || LONEOS || SYL7:4 || align=right | 8.4 km || 
|-id=316 bgcolor=#E9E9E9
| 117316 ||  || — || November 5, 2004 || Palomar || NEAT || — || align=right | 5.2 km || 
|-id=317 bgcolor=#E9E9E9
| 117317 ||  || — || November 9, 2004 || Catalina || CSS || — || align=right | 3.9 km || 
|-id=318 bgcolor=#E9E9E9
| 117318 ||  || — || November 6, 2004 || Socorro || LINEAR || — || align=right | 2.2 km || 
|-id=319 bgcolor=#d6d6d6
| 117319 ||  || — || November 10, 2004 || Kitt Peak || Spacewatch || — || align=right | 6.7 km || 
|-id=320 bgcolor=#d6d6d6
| 117320 ||  || — || November 10, 2004 || Kitt Peak || Spacewatch || — || align=right | 4.2 km || 
|-id=321 bgcolor=#d6d6d6
| 117321 ||  || — || November 10, 2004 || Kitt Peak || Spacewatch || — || align=right | 5.0 km || 
|-id=322 bgcolor=#d6d6d6
| 117322 ||  || — || November 4, 2004 || Anderson Mesa || LONEOS || — || align=right | 5.7 km || 
|-id=323 bgcolor=#fefefe
| 117323 ||  || — || November 12, 2004 || Socorro || LINEAR || H || align=right | 1.4 km || 
|-id=324 bgcolor=#fefefe
| 117324 ||  || — || November 18, 2004 || Campo Imperatore || CINEOS || — || align=right | 1.5 km || 
|-id=325 bgcolor=#d6d6d6
| 117325 ||  || — || November 18, 2004 || Socorro || LINEAR || — || align=right | 6.5 km || 
|-id=326 bgcolor=#fefefe
| 117326 ||  || — || November 18, 2004 || Socorro || LINEAR || FLO || align=right | 1.5 km || 
|-id=327 bgcolor=#E9E9E9
| 117327 ||  || — || November 19, 2004 || Socorro || LINEAR || RAF || align=right | 2.6 km || 
|-id=328 bgcolor=#d6d6d6
| 117328 ||  || — || November 21, 2004 || Campo Imperatore || CINEOS || — || align=right | 3.9 km || 
|-id=329 bgcolor=#fefefe
| 117329 Spencer ||  ||  || December 9, 2004 || Jarnac || Jarnac Obs. || — || align=right | 3.0 km || 
|-id=330 bgcolor=#d6d6d6
| 117330 ||  || — || December 2, 2004 || Kitt Peak || Spacewatch || EOS || align=right | 4.8 km || 
|-id=331 bgcolor=#E9E9E9
| 117331 ||  || — || December 2, 2004 || Catalina || CSS || EUN || align=right | 3.3 km || 
|-id=332 bgcolor=#d6d6d6
| 117332 ||  || — || December 3, 2004 || Kitt Peak || Spacewatch || — || align=right | 3.5 km || 
|-id=333 bgcolor=#E9E9E9
| 117333 ||  || — || December 3, 2004 || Palomar || NEAT || — || align=right | 4.1 km || 
|-id=334 bgcolor=#E9E9E9
| 117334 ||  || — || December 3, 2004 || Kitt Peak || Spacewatch || — || align=right | 3.7 km || 
|-id=335 bgcolor=#E9E9E9
| 117335 ||  || — || December 7, 2004 || Socorro || LINEAR || BRG || align=right | 4.3 km || 
|-id=336 bgcolor=#d6d6d6
| 117336 ||  || — || December 9, 2004 || Socorro || LINEAR || — || align=right | 2.9 km || 
|-id=337 bgcolor=#E9E9E9
| 117337 ||  || — || December 3, 2004 || Kitt Peak || Spacewatch || — || align=right | 2.6 km || 
|-id=338 bgcolor=#d6d6d6
| 117338 ||  || — || December 8, 2004 || Socorro || LINEAR || HYG || align=right | 5.2 km || 
|-id=339 bgcolor=#d6d6d6
| 117339 ||  || — || December 8, 2004 || Socorro || LINEAR || — || align=right | 9.0 km || 
|-id=340 bgcolor=#fefefe
| 117340 ||  || — || December 8, 2004 || Socorro || LINEAR || PHO || align=right | 3.2 km || 
|-id=341 bgcolor=#d6d6d6
| 117341 ||  || — || December 10, 2004 || Socorro || LINEAR || KOR || align=right | 3.0 km || 
|-id=342 bgcolor=#E9E9E9
| 117342 ||  || — || December 7, 2004 || Socorro || LINEAR || — || align=right | 3.9 km || 
|-id=343 bgcolor=#E9E9E9
| 117343 ||  || — || December 7, 2004 || Socorro || LINEAR || MAR || align=right | 1.8 km || 
|-id=344 bgcolor=#d6d6d6
| 117344 ||  || — || December 11, 2004 || Socorro || LINEAR || — || align=right | 5.0 km || 
|-id=345 bgcolor=#E9E9E9
| 117345 ||  || — || December 11, 2004 || Campo Imperatore || CINEOS || — || align=right | 5.0 km || 
|-id=346 bgcolor=#d6d6d6
| 117346 ||  || — || December 9, 2004 || Kitt Peak || Spacewatch || — || align=right | 4.9 km || 
|-id=347 bgcolor=#E9E9E9
| 117347 ||  || — || December 10, 2004 || Anderson Mesa || LONEOS || — || align=right | 5.0 km || 
|-id=348 bgcolor=#d6d6d6
| 117348 ||  || — || December 11, 2004 || Kitt Peak || Spacewatch || MEL || align=right | 11 km || 
|-id=349 bgcolor=#d6d6d6
| 117349 ||  || — || December 11, 2004 || Socorro || LINEAR || — || align=right | 7.6 km || 
|-id=350 bgcolor=#d6d6d6
| 117350 Saburo ||  ||  || December 13, 2004 || Yamagata || K. Itagaki || — || align=right | 8.3 km || 
|-id=351 bgcolor=#E9E9E9
| 117351 ||  || — || December 9, 2004 || Catalina || CSS || — || align=right | 2.6 km || 
|-id=352 bgcolor=#E9E9E9
| 117352 ||  || — || December 10, 2004 || Socorro || LINEAR || — || align=right | 2.8 km || 
|-id=353 bgcolor=#d6d6d6
| 117353 ||  || — || December 11, 2004 || Catalina || CSS || ALA || align=right | 6.7 km || 
|-id=354 bgcolor=#d6d6d6
| 117354 ||  || — || December 9, 2004 || Catalina || CSS || — || align=right | 4.0 km || 
|-id=355 bgcolor=#fefefe
| 117355 ||  || — || December 14, 2004 || Socorro || LINEAR || — || align=right | 1.8 km || 
|-id=356 bgcolor=#d6d6d6
| 117356 ||  || — || December 9, 2004 || Socorro || LINEAR || — || align=right | 6.0 km || 
|-id=357 bgcolor=#E9E9E9
| 117357 ||  || — || December 10, 2004 || Socorro || LINEAR || — || align=right | 3.4 km || 
|-id=358 bgcolor=#fefefe
| 117358 ||  || — || December 11, 2004 || Kitt Peak || Spacewatch || NYS || align=right | 1.1 km || 
|-id=359 bgcolor=#E9E9E9
| 117359 ||  || — || December 13, 2004 || Anderson Mesa || LONEOS || — || align=right | 4.5 km || 
|-id=360 bgcolor=#E9E9E9
| 117360 ||  || — || December 14, 2004 || Anderson Mesa || LONEOS || CLO || align=right | 4.0 km || 
|-id=361 bgcolor=#E9E9E9
| 117361 ||  || — || December 9, 2004 || Catalina || CSS || — || align=right | 2.9 km || 
|-id=362 bgcolor=#E9E9E9
| 117362 ||  || — || December 9, 2004 || Catalina || CSS || — || align=right | 2.3 km || 
|-id=363 bgcolor=#E9E9E9
| 117363 ||  || — || December 10, 2004 || Anderson Mesa || LONEOS || MAR || align=right | 2.5 km || 
|-id=364 bgcolor=#d6d6d6
| 117364 ||  || — || December 11, 2004 || Socorro || LINEAR || — || align=right | 3.8 km || 
|-id=365 bgcolor=#d6d6d6
| 117365 ||  || — || December 11, 2004 || Socorro || LINEAR || EOS || align=right | 4.3 km || 
|-id=366 bgcolor=#fefefe
| 117366 ||  || — || December 11, 2004 || Socorro || LINEAR || — || align=right | 1.8 km || 
|-id=367 bgcolor=#E9E9E9
| 117367 ||  || — || December 11, 2004 || Socorro || LINEAR || — || align=right | 2.0 km || 
|-id=368 bgcolor=#fefefe
| 117368 ||  || — || December 12, 2004 || Kitt Peak || Spacewatch || MAS || align=right | 1.4 km || 
|-id=369 bgcolor=#E9E9E9
| 117369 ||  || — || December 14, 2004 || Catalina || CSS || — || align=right | 2.7 km || 
|-id=370 bgcolor=#d6d6d6
| 117370 ||  || — || December 14, 2004 || Anderson Mesa || LONEOS || — || align=right | 3.2 km || 
|-id=371 bgcolor=#d6d6d6
| 117371 ||  || — || December 12, 2004 || Anderson Mesa || LONEOS || EUP || align=right | 10 km || 
|-id=372 bgcolor=#E9E9E9
| 117372 ||  || — || December 13, 2004 || Socorro || LINEAR || — || align=right | 3.9 km || 
|-id=373 bgcolor=#d6d6d6
| 117373 ||  || — || December 13, 2004 || Anderson Mesa || LONEOS || — || align=right | 7.4 km || 
|-id=374 bgcolor=#fefefe
| 117374 ||  || — || December 13, 2004 || Campo Imperatore || CINEOS || NYS || align=right | 1.2 km || 
|-id=375 bgcolor=#d6d6d6
| 117375 ||  || — || December 14, 2004 || Socorro || LINEAR || — || align=right | 6.0 km || 
|-id=376 bgcolor=#d6d6d6
| 117376 ||  || — || December 14, 2004 || Socorro || LINEAR || — || align=right | 4.6 km || 
|-id=377 bgcolor=#d6d6d6
| 117377 ||  || — || December 14, 2004 || Kitt Peak || Spacewatch || EOS || align=right | 5.0 km || 
|-id=378 bgcolor=#E9E9E9
| 117378 ||  || — || December 3, 2004 || Anderson Mesa || LONEOS || PAD || align=right | 4.1 km || 
|-id=379 bgcolor=#d6d6d6
| 117379 ||  || — || December 9, 2004 || Catalina || CSS || — || align=right | 4.9 km || 
|-id=380 bgcolor=#d6d6d6
| 117380 ||  || — || December 11, 2004 || Kitt Peak || Spacewatch || — || align=right | 7.6 km || 
|-id=381 bgcolor=#d6d6d6
| 117381 Lindaweiland || 2004 YU ||  || December 18, 2004 || Junk Bond || D. Healy || KOR || align=right | 3.1 km || 
|-id=382 bgcolor=#fefefe
| 117382 ||  || — || December 16, 2004 || Anderson Mesa || LONEOS || — || align=right | 1.6 km || 
|-id=383 bgcolor=#d6d6d6
| 117383 ||  || — || December 16, 2004 || Kitt Peak || Spacewatch || CRO || align=right | 6.1 km || 
|-id=384 bgcolor=#fefefe
| 117384 Halharrison ||  ||  || December 18, 2004 || Mount Lemmon || Mount Lemmon Survey || — || align=right | 1.9 km || 
|-id=385 bgcolor=#C2FFFF
| 117385 ||  || — || December 18, 2004 || Mount Lemmon || Mount Lemmon Survey || L5 || align=right | 22 km || 
|-id=386 bgcolor=#d6d6d6
| 117386 Thomasschlapkohl ||  ||  || December 18, 2004 || Mount Lemmon || Mount Lemmon Survey || — || align=right | 3.4 km || 
|-id=387 bgcolor=#E9E9E9
| 117387 Javiercerna ||  ||  || December 18, 2004 || Mount Lemmon || Mount Lemmon Survey || — || align=right | 4.3 km || 
|-id=388 bgcolor=#fefefe
| 117388 Jamiemoore ||  ||  || December 18, 2004 || Mount Lemmon || Mount Lemmon Survey || NYS || align=right | 1.2 km || 
|-id=389 bgcolor=#C2FFFF
| 117389 ||  || — || December 18, 2004 || Mount Lemmon || Mount Lemmon Survey || L5 || align=right | 19 km || 
|-id=390 bgcolor=#d6d6d6
| 117390 Stephanegendron ||  ||  || December 19, 2004 || Mount Lemmon || Mount Lemmon Survey || THM || align=right | 4.5 km || 
|-id=391 bgcolor=#E9E9E9
| 117391 ||  || — || December 18, 2004 || Socorro || LINEAR || — || align=right | 3.0 km || 
|-id=392 bgcolor=#E9E9E9
| 117392 ||  || — || December 19, 2004 || Kitt Peak || Spacewatch || — || align=right | 4.7 km || 
|-id=393 bgcolor=#fefefe
| 117393 ||  || — || December 21, 2004 || Catalina || CSS || NYS || align=right | 1.3 km || 
|-id=394 bgcolor=#d6d6d6
| 117394 ||  || — || December 16, 2004 || Anderson Mesa || LONEOS || — || align=right | 8.7 km || 
|-id=395 bgcolor=#C2FFFF
| 117395 ||  || — || December 21, 2004 || Catalina || CSS || L5 || align=right | 17 km || 
|-id=396 bgcolor=#d6d6d6
| 117396 ||  || — || January 1, 2005 || Catalina || CSS || — || align=right | 4.7 km || 
|-id=397 bgcolor=#fefefe
| 117397 ||  || — || January 1, 2005 || Catalina || CSS || NYS || align=right | 1.2 km || 
|-id=398 bgcolor=#d6d6d6
| 117398 ||  || — || January 6, 2005 || Socorro || LINEAR || — || align=right | 6.5 km || 
|-id=399 bgcolor=#fefefe
| 117399 ||  || — || January 6, 2005 || Catalina || CSS || FLO || align=right | 1.1 km || 
|-id=400 bgcolor=#fefefe
| 117400 ||  || — || January 6, 2005 || Catalina || CSS || FLO || align=right | 1.3 km || 
|}

117401–117500 

|-bgcolor=#E9E9E9
| 117401 ||  || — || January 6, 2005 || Catalina || CSS || — || align=right | 4.8 km || 
|-id=402 bgcolor=#E9E9E9
| 117402 ||  || — || January 6, 2005 || Catalina || CSS || — || align=right | 3.3 km || 
|-id=403 bgcolor=#E9E9E9
| 117403 ||  || — || January 6, 2005 || Catalina || CSS || MIT || align=right | 4.5 km || 
|-id=404 bgcolor=#C2FFFF
| 117404 ||  || — || January 7, 2005 || Socorro || LINEAR || L5 || align=right | 23 km || 
|-id=405 bgcolor=#E9E9E9
| 117405 ||  || — || January 6, 2005 || Catalina || CSS || — || align=right | 2.3 km || 
|-id=406 bgcolor=#d6d6d6
| 117406 Blasgámez ||  ||  || January 7, 2005 || Pla D'Arguines || R. Ferrando || — || align=right | 7.3 km || 
|-id=407 bgcolor=#E9E9E9
| 117407 ||  || — || January 1, 2005 || Črni Vrh || Črni Vrh || — || align=right | 2.5 km || 
|-id=408 bgcolor=#d6d6d6
| 117408 ||  || — || January 1, 2005 || Catalina || CSS || — || align=right | 5.6 km || 
|-id=409 bgcolor=#d6d6d6
| 117409 ||  || — || January 1, 2005 || Catalina || CSS || — || align=right | 6.6 km || 
|-id=410 bgcolor=#E9E9E9
| 117410 ||  || — || January 6, 2005 || Catalina || CSS || — || align=right | 1.8 km || 
|-id=411 bgcolor=#d6d6d6
| 117411 ||  || — || January 6, 2005 || Catalina || CSS || EOS || align=right | 3.7 km || 
|-id=412 bgcolor=#d6d6d6
| 117412 ||  || — || January 6, 2005 || Catalina || CSS || — || align=right | 4.0 km || 
|-id=413 bgcolor=#fefefe
| 117413 Ramonycajal ||  ||  || January 8, 2005 || La Cañada || J. Lacruz || NYS || align=right | 1.4 km || 
|-id=414 bgcolor=#E9E9E9
| 117414 ||  || — || January 9, 2005 || Catalina || CSS || — || align=right | 2.0 km || 
|-id=415 bgcolor=#E9E9E9
| 117415 ||  || — || January 6, 2005 || Socorro || LINEAR || — || align=right | 1.3 km || 
|-id=416 bgcolor=#E9E9E9
| 117416 ||  || — || January 6, 2005 || Catalina || CSS || — || align=right | 2.9 km || 
|-id=417 bgcolor=#E9E9E9
| 117417 ||  || — || January 6, 2005 || Socorro || LINEAR || — || align=right | 2.4 km || 
|-id=418 bgcolor=#d6d6d6
| 117418 ||  || — || January 6, 2005 || Socorro || LINEAR || — || align=right | 5.6 km || 
|-id=419 bgcolor=#d6d6d6
| 117419 ||  || — || January 6, 2005 || Socorro || LINEAR || — || align=right | 7.0 km || 
|-id=420 bgcolor=#E9E9E9
| 117420 ||  || — || January 6, 2005 || Socorro || LINEAR || — || align=right | 3.5 km || 
|-id=421 bgcolor=#fefefe
| 117421 ||  || — || January 6, 2005 || Socorro || LINEAR || — || align=right | 1.6 km || 
|-id=422 bgcolor=#fefefe
| 117422 ||  || — || January 6, 2005 || Socorro || LINEAR || NYS || align=right | 1.2 km || 
|-id=423 bgcolor=#C2FFFF
| 117423 ||  || — || January 7, 2005 || Socorro || LINEAR || L5 || align=right | 17 km || 
|-id=424 bgcolor=#E9E9E9
| 117424 ||  || — || January 6, 2005 || Socorro || LINEAR || — || align=right | 4.7 km || 
|-id=425 bgcolor=#d6d6d6
| 117425 ||  || — || January 6, 2005 || Socorro || LINEAR || KOR || align=right | 3.1 km || 
|-id=426 bgcolor=#fefefe
| 117426 ||  || — || January 6, 2005 || Socorro || LINEAR || NYS || align=right | 1.4 km || 
|-id=427 bgcolor=#E9E9E9
| 117427 ||  || — || January 6, 2005 || Goodricke-Pigott || R. A. Tucker || MAR || align=right | 2.3 km || 
|-id=428 bgcolor=#fefefe
| 117428 ||  || — || January 7, 2005 || Socorro || LINEAR || — || align=right | 4.0 km || 
|-id=429 bgcolor=#fefefe
| 117429 ||  || — || January 11, 2005 || Socorro || LINEAR || — || align=right | 1.3 km || 
|-id=430 bgcolor=#d6d6d6
| 117430 Achosyx ||  ||  || January 13, 2005 || New Mexico Skies || A. Lowe || — || align=right | 7.0 km || 
|-id=431 bgcolor=#E9E9E9
| 117431 ||  || — || January 13, 2005 || Socorro || LINEAR || — || align=right | 2.8 km || 
|-id=432 bgcolor=#fefefe
| 117432 ||  || — || January 7, 2005 || Socorro || LINEAR || NYS || align=right | 2.2 km || 
|-id=433 bgcolor=#d6d6d6
| 117433 ||  || — || January 15, 2005 || Catalina || CSS || Tj (2.99) || align=right | 7.8 km || 
|-id=434 bgcolor=#fefefe
| 117434 ||  || — || January 13, 2005 || Kitt Peak || Spacewatch || V || align=right | 1.4 km || 
|-id=435 bgcolor=#E9E9E9
| 117435 Severochoa ||  ||  || January 14, 2005 || La Cañada || J. Lacruz || HOF || align=right | 4.5 km || 
|-id=436 bgcolor=#E9E9E9
| 117436 ||  || — || January 9, 2005 || Catalina || CSS || — || align=right | 3.7 km || 
|-id=437 bgcolor=#E9E9E9
| 117437 ||  || — || January 9, 2005 || Catalina || CSS || EUN || align=right | 2.5 km || 
|-id=438 bgcolor=#E9E9E9
| 117438 ||  || — || January 13, 2005 || Socorro || LINEAR || — || align=right | 1.5 km || 
|-id=439 bgcolor=#E9E9E9
| 117439 Rosner ||  ||  || January 13, 2005 || New Mexico Skies || A. Lowe || — || align=right | 1.5 km || 
|-id=440 bgcolor=#d6d6d6
| 117440 ||  || — || January 13, 2005 || Kitt Peak || Spacewatch || — || align=right | 4.7 km || 
|-id=441 bgcolor=#E9E9E9
| 117441 ||  || — || January 13, 2005 || Kitt Peak || Spacewatch || — || align=right | 2.3 km || 
|-id=442 bgcolor=#E9E9E9
| 117442 ||  || — || January 13, 2005 || Socorro || LINEAR || — || align=right | 4.0 km || 
|-id=443 bgcolor=#E9E9E9
| 117443 ||  || — || January 15, 2005 || Socorro || LINEAR || — || align=right | 1.9 km || 
|-id=444 bgcolor=#fefefe
| 117444 ||  || — || January 15, 2005 || Socorro || LINEAR || FLO || align=right | 1.0 km || 
|-id=445 bgcolor=#fefefe
| 117445 ||  || — || January 15, 2005 || Kitt Peak || Spacewatch || MAS || align=right | 1.6 km || 
|-id=446 bgcolor=#C2FFFF
| 117446 ||  || — || January 11, 2005 || Socorro || LINEAR || L5 || align=right | 15 km || 
|-id=447 bgcolor=#C2FFFF
| 117447 ||  || — || January 11, 2005 || Socorro || LINEAR || L5 || align=right | 31 km || 
|-id=448 bgcolor=#fefefe
| 117448 ||  || — || January 11, 2005 || Socorro || LINEAR || NYS || align=right | 1.3 km || 
|-id=449 bgcolor=#E9E9E9
| 117449 ||  || — || January 12, 2005 || Socorro || LINEAR || — || align=right | 4.7 km || 
|-id=450 bgcolor=#d6d6d6
| 117450 ||  || — || January 12, 2005 || Socorro || LINEAR || EOS || align=right | 4.8 km || 
|-id=451 bgcolor=#fefefe
| 117451 ||  || — || January 13, 2005 || Catalina || CSS || — || align=right | 3.6 km || 
|-id=452 bgcolor=#E9E9E9
| 117452 ||  || — || January 15, 2005 || Socorro || LINEAR || — || align=right | 2.4 km || 
|-id=453 bgcolor=#d6d6d6
| 117453 ||  || — || January 15, 2005 || Socorro || LINEAR || — || align=right | 4.2 km || 
|-id=454 bgcolor=#d6d6d6
| 117454 ||  || — || January 15, 2005 || Socorro || LINEAR || KOR || align=right | 2.3 km || 
|-id=455 bgcolor=#fefefe
| 117455 ||  || — || January 15, 2005 || Kitt Peak || Spacewatch || V || align=right | 1.2 km || 
|-id=456 bgcolor=#fefefe
| 117456 ||  || — || January 13, 2005 || Anderson Mesa || LONEOS || — || align=right | 1.3 km || 
|-id=457 bgcolor=#E9E9E9
| 117457 ||  || — || January 13, 2005 || Kitt Peak || Spacewatch || — || align=right | 3.2 km || 
|-id=458 bgcolor=#d6d6d6
| 117458 ||  || — || January 15, 2005 || Kitt Peak || Spacewatch || — || align=right | 4.5 km || 
|-id=459 bgcolor=#fefefe
| 117459 ||  || — || January 15, 2005 || Kitt Peak || Spacewatch || NYS || align=right | 1.6 km || 
|-id=460 bgcolor=#d6d6d6
| 117460 ||  || — || January 15, 2005 || Kitt Peak || Spacewatch || HYG || align=right | 5.2 km || 
|-id=461 bgcolor=#E9E9E9
| 117461 ||  || — || January 15, 2005 || Kitt Peak || Spacewatch || — || align=right | 3.7 km || 
|-id=462 bgcolor=#d6d6d6
| 117462 ||  || — || January 16, 2005 || Anderson Mesa || LONEOS || — || align=right | 5.7 km || 
|-id=463 bgcolor=#d6d6d6
| 117463 ||  || — || January 16, 2005 || Catalina || CSS || — || align=right | 5.3 km || 
|-id=464 bgcolor=#d6d6d6
| 117464 ||  || — || January 16, 2005 || Socorro || LINEAR || EOS || align=right | 3.4 km || 
|-id=465 bgcolor=#E9E9E9
| 117465 ||  || — || January 16, 2005 || Socorro || LINEAR || — || align=right | 4.9 km || 
|-id=466 bgcolor=#fefefe
| 117466 ||  || — || January 16, 2005 || Socorro || LINEAR || — || align=right | 1.2 km || 
|-id=467 bgcolor=#fefefe
| 117467 ||  || — || January 16, 2005 || Kitt Peak || Spacewatch || — || align=right | 2.7 km || 
|-id=468 bgcolor=#E9E9E9
| 117468 ||  || — || January 16, 2005 || Kitt Peak || Spacewatch || — || align=right | 3.9 km || 
|-id=469 bgcolor=#fefefe
| 117469 ||  || — || January 16, 2005 || Kitt Peak || Spacewatch || V || align=right | 1.2 km || 
|-id=470 bgcolor=#d6d6d6
| 117470 ||  || — || January 16, 2005 || Kitt Peak || Spacewatch || — || align=right | 3.9 km || 
|-id=471 bgcolor=#d6d6d6
| 117471 ||  || — || January 17, 2005 || Kitt Peak || Spacewatch || EOS || align=right | 4.5 km || 
|-id=472 bgcolor=#E9E9E9
| 117472 ||  || — || January 17, 2005 || Kitt Peak || Spacewatch || — || align=right | 1.8 km || 
|-id=473 bgcolor=#fefefe
| 117473 ||  || — || January 17, 2005 || Kitt Peak || Spacewatch || — || align=right | 1.4 km || 
|-id=474 bgcolor=#E9E9E9
| 117474 ||  || — || January 16, 2005 || Socorro || LINEAR || — || align=right | 3.7 km || 
|-id=475 bgcolor=#d6d6d6
| 117475 ||  || — || January 16, 2005 || Kitt Peak || Spacewatch || — || align=right | 4.1 km || 
|-id=476 bgcolor=#d6d6d6
| 117476 ||  || — || January 16, 2005 || Kitt Peak || Spacewatch || EOS || align=right | 4.0 km || 
|-id=477 bgcolor=#d6d6d6
| 117477 ||  || — || January 17, 2005 || Socorro || LINEAR || — || align=right | 4.8 km || 
|-id=478 bgcolor=#fefefe
| 117478 ||  || — || January 18, 2005 || Catalina || CSS || NYS || align=right data-sort-value="0.92" | 920 m || 
|-id=479 bgcolor=#d6d6d6
| 117479 ||  || — || January 19, 2005 || Kitt Peak || Spacewatch || — || align=right | 4.0 km || 
|-id=480 bgcolor=#E9E9E9
| 117480 ||  || — || January 31, 2005 || Socorro || LINEAR || EUN || align=right | 2.9 km || 
|-id=481 bgcolor=#fefefe
| 117481 ||  || — || January 31, 2005 || New Mexico Skies || A. Lowe || NYS || align=right | 3.1 km || 
|-id=482 bgcolor=#d6d6d6
| 117482 ||  || — || February 1, 2005 || Kitt Peak || Spacewatch || KAR || align=right | 2.0 km || 
|-id=483 bgcolor=#fefefe
| 117483 ||  || — || February 1, 2005 || Kitt Peak || Spacewatch || NYS || align=right | 2.8 km || 
|-id=484 bgcolor=#d6d6d6
| 117484 ||  || — || February 1, 2005 || Kitt Peak || Spacewatch || — || align=right | 6.0 km || 
|-id=485 bgcolor=#fefefe
| 117485 ||  || — || February 1, 2005 || Kitt Peak || Spacewatch || — || align=right | 1.5 km || 
|-id=486 bgcolor=#d6d6d6
| 117486 ||  || — || February 1, 2005 || Kitt Peak || Spacewatch || — || align=right | 5.6 km || 
|-id=487 bgcolor=#E9E9E9
| 117487 ||  || — || February 2, 2005 || Palomar || NEAT || — || align=right | 2.4 km || 
|-id=488 bgcolor=#E9E9E9
| 117488 ||  || — || February 2, 2005 || Kitt Peak || Spacewatch || — || align=right | 1.4 km || 
|-id=489 bgcolor=#E9E9E9
| 117489 ||  || — || February 2, 2005 || Socorro || LINEAR || — || align=right | 1.8 km || 
|-id=490 bgcolor=#E9E9E9
| 117490 ||  || — || February 2, 2005 || Socorro || LINEAR || — || align=right | 4.5 km || 
|-id=491 bgcolor=#fefefe
| 117491 ||  || — || February 2, 2005 || Socorro || LINEAR || — || align=right | 1.3 km || 
|-id=492 bgcolor=#fefefe
| 117492 ||  || — || February 2, 2005 || Catalina || CSS || NYS || align=right | 1.1 km || 
|-id=493 bgcolor=#fefefe
| 117493 ||  || — || February 2, 2005 || Catalina || CSS || NYS || align=right | 1.3 km || 
|-id=494 bgcolor=#d6d6d6
| 117494 ||  || — || February 2, 2005 || Catalina || CSS || — || align=right | 3.7 km || 
|-id=495 bgcolor=#fefefe
| 117495 ||  || — || February 2, 2005 || Kitt Peak || Spacewatch || NYS || align=right | 1.3 km || 
|-id=496 bgcolor=#E9E9E9
| 117496 ||  || — || February 2, 2005 || Catalina || CSS || — || align=right | 4.1 km || 
|-id=497 bgcolor=#fefefe
| 117497 ||  || — || February 2, 2005 || Catalina || CSS || — || align=right | 2.6 km || 
|-id=498 bgcolor=#fefefe
| 117498 ||  || — || February 2, 2005 || Catalina || CSS || — || align=right | 2.1 km || 
|-id=499 bgcolor=#fefefe
| 117499 ||  || — || February 2, 2005 || Catalina || CSS || FLO || align=right | 1.3 km || 
|-id=500 bgcolor=#E9E9E9
| 117500 ||  || — || February 3, 2005 || Socorro || LINEAR || — || align=right | 5.5 km || 
|}

117501–117600 

|-bgcolor=#d6d6d6
| 117501 ||  || — || February 1, 2005 || Catalina || CSS || ALA || align=right | 8.3 km || 
|-id=502 bgcolor=#E9E9E9
| 117502 ||  || — || February 1, 2005 || Catalina || CSS || 526 || align=right | 5.3 km || 
|-id=503 bgcolor=#d6d6d6
| 117503 ||  || — || February 1, 2005 || Catalina || CSS || — || align=right | 7.5 km || 
|-id=504 bgcolor=#E9E9E9
| 117504 ||  || — || February 1, 2005 || Catalina || CSS || — || align=right | 2.5 km || 
|-id=505 bgcolor=#E9E9E9
| 117505 ||  || — || February 4, 2005 || Palomar || NEAT || — || align=right | 5.8 km || 
|-id=506 bgcolor=#fefefe
| 117506 Wildberg ||  ||  || February 5, 2005 || Wildberg || R. Apitzsch || FLO || align=right data-sort-value="0.92" | 920 m || 
|-id=507 bgcolor=#d6d6d6
| 117507 ||  || — || February 1, 2005 || Kitt Peak || Spacewatch || EUP || align=right | 7.5 km || 
|-id=508 bgcolor=#d6d6d6
| 117508 ||  || — || February 3, 2005 || Palomar || NEAT || ALA || align=right | 6.5 km || 
|-id=509 bgcolor=#E9E9E9
| 117509 ||  || — || February 3, 2005 || Socorro || LINEAR || — || align=right | 4.8 km || 
|-id=510 bgcolor=#fefefe
| 117510 ||  || — || February 5, 2005 || Bergisch Gladbach || W. Bickel || — || align=right | 1.6 km || 
|-id=511 bgcolor=#fefefe
| 117511 ||  || — || February 5, 2005 || Cordell-Lorenz || D. T. Durig, V. L. Nixon || MAS || align=right | 1.5 km || 
|-id=512 bgcolor=#E9E9E9
| 117512 ||  || — || February 2, 2005 || Socorro || LINEAR || — || align=right | 2.7 km || 
|-id=513 bgcolor=#fefefe
| 117513 ||  || — || February 2, 2005 || Socorro || LINEAR || NYS || align=right | 1.1 km || 
|-id=514 bgcolor=#d6d6d6
| 117514 ||  || — || February 2, 2005 || Socorro || LINEAR || — || align=right | 6.2 km || 
|-id=515 bgcolor=#E9E9E9
| 117515 ||  || — || February 2, 2005 || Catalina || CSS || — || align=right | 2.2 km || 
|-id=516 bgcolor=#E9E9E9
| 117516 ||  || — || February 2, 2005 || Catalina || CSS || — || align=right | 2.9 km || 
|-id=517 bgcolor=#fefefe
| 117517 ||  || — || February 2, 2005 || Socorro || LINEAR || NYS || align=right | 1.3 km || 
|-id=518 bgcolor=#fefefe
| 117518 ||  || — || February 2, 2005 || Socorro || LINEAR || V || align=right | 1.2 km || 
|-id=519 bgcolor=#fefefe
| 117519 ||  || — || February 2, 2005 || Kitt Peak || Spacewatch || EUT || align=right | 1.2 km || 
|-id=520 bgcolor=#fefefe
| 117520 ||  || — || February 2, 2005 || Catalina || CSS || — || align=right | 1.7 km || 
|-id=521 bgcolor=#fefefe
| 117521 ||  || — || February 2, 2005 || Kitt Peak || Spacewatch || — || align=right | 1.3 km || 
|-id=522 bgcolor=#fefefe
| 117522 ||  || — || February 2, 2005 || Kitt Peak || Spacewatch || NYS || align=right | 1.0 km || 
|-id=523 bgcolor=#d6d6d6
| 117523 ||  || — || February 2, 2005 || Kitt Peak || Spacewatch || — || align=right | 4.6 km || 
|-id=524 bgcolor=#fefefe
| 117524 ||  || — || February 3, 2005 || Socorro || LINEAR || NYS || align=right | 1.5 km || 
|-id=525 bgcolor=#fefefe
| 117525 ||  || — || February 3, 2005 || Socorro || LINEAR || NYS || align=right | 1.1 km || 
|-id=526 bgcolor=#E9E9E9
| 117526 ||  || — || February 2, 2005 || Socorro || LINEAR || — || align=right | 3.8 km || 
|-id=527 bgcolor=#E9E9E9
| 117527 ||  || — || February 2, 2005 || Catalina || CSS || — || align=right | 1.4 km || 
|-id=528 bgcolor=#E9E9E9
| 117528 ||  || — || February 2, 2005 || Catalina || CSS || — || align=right | 2.0 km || 
|-id=529 bgcolor=#E9E9E9
| 117529 ||  || — || February 2, 2005 || Socorro || LINEAR || — || align=right | 1.5 km || 
|-id=530 bgcolor=#fefefe
| 117530 ||  || — || February 2, 2005 || Palomar || NEAT || — || align=right | 1.6 km || 
|-id=531 bgcolor=#fefefe
| 117531 ||  || — || February 2, 2005 || Catalina || CSS || V || align=right | 1.3 km || 
|-id=532 bgcolor=#d6d6d6
| 117532 ||  || — || February 3, 2005 || Socorro || LINEAR || — || align=right | 9.7 km || 
|-id=533 bgcolor=#E9E9E9
| 117533 ||  || — || February 9, 2005 || Kitt Peak || Spacewatch || — || align=right | 4.8 km || 
|-id=534 bgcolor=#d6d6d6
| 117534 ||  || — || February 9, 2005 || Anderson Mesa || LONEOS || — || align=right | 4.4 km || 
|-id=535 bgcolor=#d6d6d6
| 117535 ||  || — || February 9, 2005 || Socorro || LINEAR || — || align=right | 5.5 km || 
|-id=536 bgcolor=#d6d6d6
| 117536 ||  || — || February 2, 2005 || Kitt Peak || Spacewatch || — || align=right | 4.4 km || 
|-id=537 bgcolor=#fefefe
| 117537 ||  || — || February 2, 2005 || Socorro || LINEAR || — || align=right | 1.3 km || 
|-id=538 bgcolor=#fefefe
| 117538 || 2005 DU || — || February 20, 2005 || Socorro || LINEAR || PHO || align=right | 3.2 km || 
|-id=539 bgcolor=#d6d6d6
| 117539 Celletti ||  ||  || February 17, 2005 || La Silla || A. Boattini, H. Scholl || — || align=right | 5.8 km || 
|-id=540 bgcolor=#fefefe
| 117540 || 2005 EN || — || March 1, 2005 || Goodricke-Pigott || R. A. Tucker || — || align=right | 1.2 km || 
|-id=541 bgcolor=#E9E9E9
| 117541 || 2005 EQ || — || March 1, 2005 || Socorro || LINEAR || HNS || align=right | 2.1 km || 
|-id=542 bgcolor=#E9E9E9
| 117542 || 2005 EV || — || March 2, 2005 || New Mexico Skies || A. Lowe || — || align=right | 3.4 km || 
|-id=543 bgcolor=#fefefe
| 117543 ||  || — || March 3, 2005 || New Mexico Skies || A. Lowe || MAS || align=right | 1.4 km || 
|-id=544 bgcolor=#fefefe
| 117544 ||  || — || March 2, 2005 || Socorro || LINEAR || PHO || align=right | 1.8 km || 
|-id=545 bgcolor=#E9E9E9
| 117545 ||  || — || March 1, 2005 || Kitt Peak || Spacewatch || — || align=right | 4.0 km || 
|-id=546 bgcolor=#d6d6d6
| 117546 ||  || — || March 1, 2005 || Kitt Peak || Spacewatch || — || align=right | 7.6 km || 
|-id=547 bgcolor=#d6d6d6
| 117547 ||  || — || March 1, 2005 || Kitt Peak || Spacewatch || — || align=right | 5.3 km || 
|-id=548 bgcolor=#E9E9E9
| 117548 ||  || — || March 1, 2005 || Kitt Peak || Spacewatch || — || align=right | 1.8 km || 
|-id=549 bgcolor=#fefefe
| 117549 ||  || — || March 1, 2005 || Kitt Peak || Spacewatch || FLO || align=right | 1.3 km || 
|-id=550 bgcolor=#fefefe
| 117550 ||  || — || March 2, 2005 || Kitt Peak || Spacewatch || — || align=right | 1.2 km || 
|-id=551 bgcolor=#fefefe
| 117551 ||  || — || March 2, 2005 || Kitt Peak || Spacewatch || V || align=right | 1.2 km || 
|-id=552 bgcolor=#fefefe
| 117552 ||  || — || March 2, 2005 || Kitt Peak || Spacewatch || — || align=right | 1.5 km || 
|-id=553 bgcolor=#fefefe
| 117553 ||  || — || March 2, 2005 || Catalina || CSS || — || align=right | 3.5 km || 
|-id=554 bgcolor=#E9E9E9
| 117554 ||  || — || March 3, 2005 || Kitt Peak || Spacewatch || — || align=right | 2.6 km || 
|-id=555 bgcolor=#d6d6d6
| 117555 ||  || — || March 3, 2005 || Kitt Peak || Spacewatch || KOR || align=right | 3.2 km || 
|-id=556 bgcolor=#fefefe
| 117556 ||  || — || March 3, 2005 || Kitt Peak || Spacewatch || — || align=right | 2.9 km || 
|-id=557 bgcolor=#d6d6d6
| 117557 ||  || — || March 3, 2005 || Catalina || CSS || HYG || align=right | 4.3 km || 
|-id=558 bgcolor=#fefefe
| 117558 ||  || — || March 3, 2005 || Catalina || CSS || — || align=right | 1.9 km || 
|-id=559 bgcolor=#E9E9E9
| 117559 ||  || — || March 3, 2005 || Catalina || CSS || — || align=right | 2.4 km || 
|-id=560 bgcolor=#fefefe
| 117560 ||  || — || March 3, 2005 || Catalina || CSS || NYS || align=right | 1.2 km || 
|-id=561 bgcolor=#fefefe
| 117561 ||  || — || March 3, 2005 || Catalina || CSS || FLO || align=right | 1.3 km || 
|-id=562 bgcolor=#fefefe
| 117562 ||  || — || March 3, 2005 || Catalina || CSS || NYS || align=right | 1.3 km || 
|-id=563 bgcolor=#fefefe
| 117563 ||  || — || March 3, 2005 || Catalina || CSS || NYS || align=right | 1.5 km || 
|-id=564 bgcolor=#E9E9E9
| 117564 ||  || — || March 3, 2005 || Catalina || CSS || — || align=right | 2.4 km || 
|-id=565 bgcolor=#E9E9E9
| 117565 ||  || — || March 3, 2005 || Catalina || CSS || — || align=right | 3.3 km || 
|-id=566 bgcolor=#fefefe
| 117566 ||  || — || March 4, 2005 || New Mexico Skies || A. Lowe || NYS || align=right | 1.0 km || 
|-id=567 bgcolor=#d6d6d6
| 117567 ||  || — || March 4, 2005 || New Mexico Skies || A. Lowe || EOS || align=right | 3.2 km || 
|-id=568 bgcolor=#E9E9E9
| 117568 Yadame ||  ||  || March 5, 2005 || Kitami || K. Endate || — || align=right | 2.2 km || 
|-id=569 bgcolor=#fefefe
| 117569 ||  || — || March 3, 2005 || Catalina || CSS || — || align=right | 1.8 km || 
|-id=570 bgcolor=#E9E9E9
| 117570 ||  || — || March 3, 2005 || Catalina || CSS || — || align=right | 5.7 km || 
|-id=571 bgcolor=#E9E9E9
| 117571 ||  || — || March 3, 2005 || Kitt Peak || Spacewatch || DOR || align=right | 4.8 km || 
|-id=572 bgcolor=#d6d6d6
| 117572 Hutsebaut ||  ||  || March 8, 2005 || New Mexico Skies || A. Lowe || EUP || align=right | 8.9 km || 
|-id=573 bgcolor=#E9E9E9
| 117573 ||  || — || March 3, 2005 || Catalina || CSS || HEN || align=right | 1.7 km || 
|-id=574 bgcolor=#E9E9E9
| 117574 ||  || — || March 3, 2005 || Catalina || CSS || — || align=right | 2.7 km || 
|-id=575 bgcolor=#fefefe
| 117575 ||  || — || March 3, 2005 || Catalina || CSS || — || align=right | 1.6 km || 
|-id=576 bgcolor=#fefefe
| 117576 ||  || — || March 3, 2005 || Kitt Peak || Spacewatch || — || align=right | 1.8 km || 
|-id=577 bgcolor=#E9E9E9
| 117577 ||  || — || March 3, 2005 || Kitt Peak || Spacewatch || — || align=right | 2.8 km || 
|-id=578 bgcolor=#E9E9E9
| 117578 ||  || — || March 4, 2005 || Catalina || CSS || — || align=right | 3.7 km || 
|-id=579 bgcolor=#d6d6d6
| 117579 ||  || — || March 4, 2005 || Catalina || CSS || HYG || align=right | 5.7 km || 
|-id=580 bgcolor=#E9E9E9
| 117580 ||  || — || March 4, 2005 || Catalina || CSS || — || align=right | 3.2 km || 
|-id=581 bgcolor=#fefefe
| 117581 Devinschrader ||  ||  || March 4, 2005 || Mount Lemmon || Mount Lemmon Survey || — || align=right | 1.6 km || 
|-id=582 bgcolor=#fefefe
| 117582 Kenjikawai ||  ||  || March 7, 2005 || Goodricke-Pigott || R. A. Tucker || — || align=right | 2.2 km || 
|-id=583 bgcolor=#E9E9E9
| 117583 ||  || — || March 1, 2005 || Kitt Peak || Spacewatch || — || align=right | 2.6 km || 
|-id=584 bgcolor=#d6d6d6
| 117584 ||  || — || March 1, 2005 || Kitt Peak || Spacewatch || — || align=right | 6.9 km || 
|-id=585 bgcolor=#fefefe
| 117585 ||  || — || March 3, 2005 || Kitt Peak || Spacewatch || NYS || align=right data-sort-value="0.98" | 980 m || 
|-id=586 bgcolor=#d6d6d6
| 117586 Twilatho ||  ||  || March 3, 2005 || Jarnac || Jarnac Obs. || EMA || align=right | 6.3 km || 
|-id=587 bgcolor=#E9E9E9
| 117587 ||  || — || March 3, 2005 || Catalina || CSS || HOF || align=right | 4.1 km || 
|-id=588 bgcolor=#fefefe
| 117588 ||  || — || March 3, 2005 || Catalina || CSS || — || align=right | 1.6 km || 
|-id=589 bgcolor=#fefefe
| 117589 ||  || — || March 3, 2005 || Catalina || CSS || V || align=right | 1.1 km || 
|-id=590 bgcolor=#E9E9E9
| 117590 ||  || — || March 3, 2005 || Catalina || CSS || — || align=right | 1.6 km || 
|-id=591 bgcolor=#E9E9E9
| 117591 ||  || — || March 3, 2005 || Catalina || CSS || PAE || align=right | 3.8 km || 
|-id=592 bgcolor=#fefefe
| 117592 ||  || — || March 3, 2005 || Catalina || CSS || — || align=right | 1.7 km || 
|-id=593 bgcolor=#d6d6d6
| 117593 ||  || — || March 3, 2005 || Catalina || CSS || HYG || align=right | 6.3 km || 
|-id=594 bgcolor=#E9E9E9
| 117594 ||  || — || March 4, 2005 || Kitt Peak || Spacewatch || — || align=right | 1.1 km || 
|-id=595 bgcolor=#d6d6d6
| 117595 Jemmadavidson ||  ||  || March 4, 2005 || Mount Lemmon || Mount Lemmon Survey || TIR || align=right | 4.6 km || 
|-id=596 bgcolor=#E9E9E9
| 117596 Richardkuhns ||  ||  || March 4, 2005 || Mount Lemmon || Mount Lemmon Survey || HOF || align=right | 5.2 km || 
|-id=597 bgcolor=#fefefe
| 117597 ||  || — || March 4, 2005 || Socorro || LINEAR || — || align=right | 1.5 km || 
|-id=598 bgcolor=#d6d6d6
| 117598 ||  || — || March 7, 2005 || Socorro || LINEAR || HYG || align=right | 5.5 km || 
|-id=599 bgcolor=#fefefe
| 117599 ||  || — || March 7, 2005 || Socorro || LINEAR || NYS || align=right | 1.4 km || 
|-id=600 bgcolor=#E9E9E9
| 117600 ||  || — || March 2, 2005 || Kitt Peak || Spacewatch || — || align=right | 1.6 km || 
|}

117601–117700 

|-bgcolor=#fefefe
| 117601 ||  || — || March 2, 2005 || Catalina || CSS || V || align=right | 1.3 km || 
|-id=602 bgcolor=#d6d6d6
| 117602 ||  || — || March 3, 2005 || Kitt Peak || Spacewatch || — || align=right | 5.1 km || 
|-id=603 bgcolor=#E9E9E9
| 117603 ||  || — || March 3, 2005 || Kitt Peak || Spacewatch || — || align=right | 1.8 km || 
|-id=604 bgcolor=#fefefe
| 117604 ||  || — || March 3, 2005 || Catalina || CSS || FLO || align=right | 1.3 km || 
|-id=605 bgcolor=#fefefe
| 117605 ||  || — || March 4, 2005 || Socorro || LINEAR || FLO || align=right | 1.5 km || 
|-id=606 bgcolor=#fefefe
| 117606 ||  || — || March 8, 2005 || Socorro || LINEAR || — || align=right | 1.4 km || 
|-id=607 bgcolor=#E9E9E9
| 117607 ||  || — || March 8, 2005 || Anderson Mesa || LONEOS || — || align=right | 6.6 km || 
|-id=608 bgcolor=#d6d6d6
| 117608 ||  || — || March 8, 2005 || Anderson Mesa || LONEOS || EOS || align=right | 3.9 km || 
|-id=609 bgcolor=#fefefe
| 117609 ||  || — || March 8, 2005 || Socorro || LINEAR || — || align=right | 1.4 km || 
|-id=610 bgcolor=#d6d6d6
| 117610 Keithmahoney ||  ||  || March 8, 2005 || Mount Lemmon || Mount Lemmon Survey || — || align=right | 5.2 km || 
|-id=611 bgcolor=#fefefe
| 117611 ||  || — || March 8, 2005 || Anderson Mesa || LONEOS || — || align=right | 1.2 km || 
|-id=612 bgcolor=#fefefe
| 117612 ||  || — || March 8, 2005 || Anderson Mesa || LONEOS || — || align=right | 1.1 km || 
|-id=613 bgcolor=#d6d6d6
| 117613 ||  || — || March 8, 2005 || Socorro || LINEAR || — || align=right | 2.5 km || 
|-id=614 bgcolor=#d6d6d6
| 117614 Hannahmclain ||  ||  || March 8, 2005 || Mount Lemmon || Mount Lemmon Survey || — || align=right | 3.2 km || 
|-id=615 bgcolor=#fefefe
| 117615 ||  || — || March 10, 2005 || New Mexico Skies || A. Lowe || — || align=right | 1.9 km || 
|-id=616 bgcolor=#E9E9E9
| 117616 ||  || — || March 11, 2005 || Catalina || CSS || BAR || align=right | 2.6 km || 
|-id=617 bgcolor=#E9E9E9
| 117617 ||  || — || March 3, 2005 || Catalina || CSS || MAR || align=right | 2.0 km || 
|-id=618 bgcolor=#d6d6d6
| 117618 ||  || — || March 3, 2005 || Catalina || CSS || — || align=right | 3.4 km || 
|-id=619 bgcolor=#E9E9E9
| 117619 ||  || — || March 3, 2005 || Catalina || CSS || AST || align=right | 3.5 km || 
|-id=620 bgcolor=#d6d6d6
| 117620 ||  || — || March 3, 2005 || Catalina || CSS || — || align=right | 11 km || 
|-id=621 bgcolor=#E9E9E9
| 117621 ||  || — || March 3, 2005 || Catalina || CSS || GEF || align=right | 2.2 km || 
|-id=622 bgcolor=#E9E9E9
| 117622 ||  || — || March 3, 2005 || Kitt Peak || Spacewatch || — || align=right | 2.9 km || 
|-id=623 bgcolor=#d6d6d6
| 117623 ||  || — || March 4, 2005 || Socorro || LINEAR || — || align=right | 5.9 km || 
|-id=624 bgcolor=#E9E9E9
| 117624 ||  || — || March 7, 2005 || Socorro || LINEAR || JUN || align=right | 2.1 km || 
|-id=625 bgcolor=#d6d6d6
| 117625 ||  || — || March 7, 2005 || Socorro || LINEAR || — || align=right | 3.8 km || 
|-id=626 bgcolor=#fefefe
| 117626 ||  || — || March 7, 2005 || Socorro || LINEAR || — || align=right | 2.6 km || 
|-id=627 bgcolor=#E9E9E9
| 117627 ||  || — || March 7, 2005 || Socorro || LINEAR || MAR || align=right | 1.5 km || 
|-id=628 bgcolor=#d6d6d6
| 117628 ||  || — || March 7, 2005 || Socorro || LINEAR || — || align=right | 5.6 km || 
|-id=629 bgcolor=#fefefe
| 117629 ||  || — || March 8, 2005 || Socorro || LINEAR || — || align=right | 1.4 km || 
|-id=630 bgcolor=#d6d6d6
| 117630 ||  || — || March 8, 2005 || Anderson Mesa || LONEOS || — || align=right | 4.8 km || 
|-id=631 bgcolor=#fefefe
| 117631 ||  || — || March 8, 2005 || Anderson Mesa || LONEOS || NYS || align=right | 1.1 km || 
|-id=632 bgcolor=#d6d6d6
| 117632 ||  || — || March 8, 2005 || Mount Lemmon || Mount Lemmon Survey || — || align=right | 5.7 km || 
|-id=633 bgcolor=#d6d6d6
| 117633 ||  || — || March 9, 2005 || Kitt Peak || Spacewatch || KAR || align=right | 1.8 km || 
|-id=634 bgcolor=#fefefe
| 117634 ||  || — || March 9, 2005 || Kitt Peak || Spacewatch || — || align=right | 1.6 km || 
|-id=635 bgcolor=#fefefe
| 117635 ||  || — || March 9, 2005 || Mount Lemmon || Mount Lemmon Survey || — || align=right | 1.6 km || 
|-id=636 bgcolor=#fefefe
| 117636 ||  || — || March 9, 2005 || Kitt Peak || Spacewatch || V || align=right | 1.5 km || 
|-id=637 bgcolor=#E9E9E9
| 117637 ||  || — || March 9, 2005 || Catalina || CSS || — || align=right | 4.5 km || 
|-id=638 bgcolor=#fefefe
| 117638 ||  || — || March 9, 2005 || Anderson Mesa || LONEOS || NYS || align=right | 1.0 km || 
|-id=639 bgcolor=#d6d6d6
| 117639 ||  || — || March 9, 2005 || Catalina || CSS || — || align=right | 8.0 km || 
|-id=640 bgcolor=#fefefe
| 117640 Millsellie ||  ||  || March 9, 2005 || Mount Lemmon || Mount Lemmon Survey || — || align=right | 1.3 km || 
|-id=641 bgcolor=#E9E9E9
| 117641 ||  || — || March 9, 2005 || Mount Lemmon || Mount Lemmon Survey || — || align=right | 3.0 km || 
|-id=642 bgcolor=#E9E9E9
| 117642 ||  || — || March 9, 2005 || Mount Lemmon || Mount Lemmon Survey || — || align=right | 3.5 km || 
|-id=643 bgcolor=#E9E9E9
| 117643 ||  || — || March 9, 2005 || Socorro || LINEAR || MAR || align=right | 2.6 km || 
|-id=644 bgcolor=#fefefe
| 117644 ||  || — || March 9, 2005 || Mount Lemmon || Mount Lemmon Survey || FLO || align=right | 1.3 km || 
|-id=645 bgcolor=#d6d6d6
| 117645 ||  || — || March 9, 2005 || Mount Lemmon || Mount Lemmon Survey || 7:4* || align=right | 4.4 km || 
|-id=646 bgcolor=#d6d6d6
| 117646 ||  || — || March 9, 2005 || Mount Lemmon || Mount Lemmon Survey || — || align=right | 4.6 km || 
|-id=647 bgcolor=#E9E9E9
| 117647 ||  || — || March 9, 2005 || Socorro || LINEAR || AER || align=right | 2.3 km || 
|-id=648 bgcolor=#fefefe
| 117648 ||  || — || March 10, 2005 || Anderson Mesa || LONEOS || — || align=right | 3.4 km || 
|-id=649 bgcolor=#fefefe
| 117649 ||  || — || March 10, 2005 || Anderson Mesa || LONEOS || — || align=right | 1.2 km || 
|-id=650 bgcolor=#fefefe
| 117650 ||  || — || March 10, 2005 || Kitt Peak || Spacewatch || V || align=right data-sort-value="0.93" | 930 m || 
|-id=651 bgcolor=#fefefe
| 117651 ||  || — || March 2, 2005 || Catalina || CSS || — || align=right | 1.4 km || 
|-id=652 bgcolor=#E9E9E9
| 117652 Joséaponte ||  ||  || March 9, 2005 || Mount Lemmon || Mount Lemmon Survey || — || align=right | 3.0 km || 
|-id=653 bgcolor=#d6d6d6
| 117653 ||  || — || March 11, 2005 || Mount Lemmon || Mount Lemmon Survey || — || align=right | 4.8 km || 
|-id=654 bgcolor=#fefefe
| 117654 ||  || — || March 7, 2005 || Socorro || LINEAR || NYS || align=right | 1.1 km || 
|-id=655 bgcolor=#d6d6d6
| 117655 ||  || — || March 9, 2005 || Anderson Mesa || LONEOS || KOR || align=right | 3.0 km || 
|-id=656 bgcolor=#d6d6d6
| 117656 ||  || — || March 10, 2005 || Mount Lemmon || Mount Lemmon Survey || — || align=right | 5.7 km || 
|-id=657 bgcolor=#fefefe
| 117657 Jamieelsila ||  ||  || March 10, 2005 || Mount Lemmon || Mount Lemmon Survey || — || align=right | 1.3 km || 
|-id=658 bgcolor=#fefefe
| 117658 ||  || — || March 10, 2005 || Mount Lemmon || Mount Lemmon Survey || — || align=right | 1.3 km || 
|-id=659 bgcolor=#d6d6d6
| 117659 ||  || — || March 10, 2005 || Siding Spring || SSS || URS || align=right | 8.3 km || 
|-id=660 bgcolor=#fefefe
| 117660 ||  || — || March 11, 2005 || Mount Lemmon || Mount Lemmon Survey || — || align=right | 1.0 km || 
|-id=661 bgcolor=#d6d6d6
| 117661 ||  || — || March 11, 2005 || Mount Lemmon || Mount Lemmon Survey || CRO || align=right | 5.9 km || 
|-id=662 bgcolor=#fefefe
| 117662 ||  || — || March 11, 2005 || Mount Lemmon || Mount Lemmon Survey || NYS || align=right | 1.0 km || 
|-id=663 bgcolor=#E9E9E9
| 117663 ||  || — || March 12, 2005 || Anderson Mesa || LONEOS || CLO || align=right | 4.6 km || 
|-id=664 bgcolor=#d6d6d6
| 117664 ||  || — || March 12, 2005 || Kitt Peak || Spacewatch || — || align=right | 4.7 km || 
|-id=665 bgcolor=#E9E9E9
| 117665 ||  || — || March 8, 2005 || Catalina || CSS || — || align=right | 2.5 km || 
|-id=666 bgcolor=#d6d6d6
| 117666 ||  || — || March 8, 2005 || Catalina || CSS || — || align=right | 7.1 km || 
|-id=667 bgcolor=#d6d6d6
| 117667 ||  || — || March 11, 2005 || Kitt Peak || Spacewatch || 3:2 || align=right | 6.1 km || 
|-id=668 bgcolor=#E9E9E9
| 117668 ||  || — || March 9, 2005 || Catalina || CSS || — || align=right | 2.5 km || 
|-id=669 bgcolor=#E9E9E9
| 117669 ||  || — || March 11, 2005 || Socorro || LINEAR || — || align=right | 1.8 km || 
|-id=670 bgcolor=#fefefe
| 117670 ||  || — || March 4, 2005 || Kitt Peak || Spacewatch || NYS || align=right data-sort-value="0.94" | 940 m || 
|-id=671 bgcolor=#E9E9E9
| 117671 ||  || — || March 4, 2005 || Mount Lemmon || Mount Lemmon Survey || — || align=right | 1.7 km || 
|-id=672 bgcolor=#d6d6d6
| 117672 ||  || — || March 4, 2005 || Catalina || CSS || — || align=right | 3.5 km || 
|-id=673 bgcolor=#fefefe
| 117673 ||  || — || March 7, 2005 || Socorro || LINEAR || — || align=right | 1.9 km || 
|-id=674 bgcolor=#fefefe
| 117674 ||  || — || March 7, 2005 || Socorro || LINEAR || NYS || align=right | 1.1 km || 
|-id=675 bgcolor=#E9E9E9
| 117675 ||  || — || March 8, 2005 || Anderson Mesa || LONEOS || — || align=right | 2.9 km || 
|-id=676 bgcolor=#E9E9E9
| 117676 ||  || — || March 10, 2005 || Siding Spring || SSS || EUN || align=right | 2.6 km || 
|-id=677 bgcolor=#d6d6d6
| 117677 ||  || — || March 11, 2005 || Mount Lemmon || Mount Lemmon Survey || — || align=right | 4.9 km || 
|-id=678 bgcolor=#d6d6d6
| 117678 ||  || — || March 8, 2005 || Socorro || LINEAR || BRA || align=right | 3.9 km || 
|-id=679 bgcolor=#E9E9E9
| 117679 ||  || — || March 10, 2005 || Anderson Mesa || LONEOS || — || align=right | 3.0 km || 
|-id=680 bgcolor=#fefefe
| 117680 ||  || — || March 13, 2005 || Kitt Peak || Spacewatch || NYS || align=right data-sort-value="0.91" | 910 m || 
|-id=681 bgcolor=#d6d6d6
| 117681 ||  || — || March 9, 2005 || Socorro || LINEAR || — || align=right | 6.4 km || 
|-id=682 bgcolor=#d6d6d6
| 117682 ||  || — || March 9, 2005 || Socorro || LINEAR || — || align=right | 7.4 km || 
|-id=683 bgcolor=#E9E9E9
| 117683 ||  || — || March 10, 2005 || Anderson Mesa || LONEOS || — || align=right | 2.1 km || 
|-id=684 bgcolor=#fefefe
| 117684 ||  || — || March 12, 2005 || Kitt Peak || Spacewatch || NYS || align=right data-sort-value="0.85" | 850 m || 
|-id=685 bgcolor=#fefefe
| 117685 ||  || — || March 12, 2005 || Kitt Peak || Spacewatch || NYS || align=right | 1.2 km || 
|-id=686 bgcolor=#E9E9E9
| 117686 ||  || — || March 10, 2005 || Catalina || CSS || — || align=right | 3.1 km || 
|-id=687 bgcolor=#fefefe
| 117687 ||  || — || March 11, 2005 || Mount Lemmon || Mount Lemmon Survey || NYS || align=right | 1.1 km || 
|-id=688 bgcolor=#d6d6d6
| 117688 ||  || — || March 14, 2005 || Mount Lemmon || Mount Lemmon Survey || KOR || align=right | 2.2 km || 
|-id=689 bgcolor=#fefefe
| 117689 ||  || — || March 14, 2005 || Mount Lemmon || Mount Lemmon Survey || V || align=right | 1.5 km || 
|-id=690 bgcolor=#fefefe
| 117690 ||  || — || March 12, 2005 || Kitt Peak || Spacewatch || MAS || align=right | 1.1 km || 
|-id=691 bgcolor=#E9E9E9
| 117691 ||  || — || March 8, 2005 || Mount Lemmon || Mount Lemmon Survey || — || align=right | 1.6 km || 
|-id=692 bgcolor=#fefefe
| 117692 ||  || — || March 8, 2005 || Socorro || LINEAR || H || align=right | 2.0 km || 
|-id=693 bgcolor=#fefefe
| 117693 ||  || — || March 9, 2005 || Mount Lemmon || Mount Lemmon Survey || V || align=right | 1.1 km || 
|-id=694 bgcolor=#fefefe
| 117694 ||  || — || March 10, 2005 || Anderson Mesa || LONEOS || PHO || align=right | 2.5 km || 
|-id=695 bgcolor=#d6d6d6
| 117695 ||  || — || March 10, 2005 || Anderson Mesa || LONEOS || — || align=right | 5.4 km || 
|-id=696 bgcolor=#d6d6d6
| 117696 ||  || — || March 10, 2005 || Catalina || CSS || — || align=right | 7.3 km || 
|-id=697 bgcolor=#d6d6d6
| 117697 ||  || — || March 10, 2005 || Catalina || CSS || — || align=right | 4.5 km || 
|-id=698 bgcolor=#E9E9E9
| 117698 ||  || — || March 9, 2005 || Mount Lemmon || Mount Lemmon Survey || — || align=right | 2.0 km || 
|-id=699 bgcolor=#E9E9E9
| 117699 ||  || — || March 9, 2005 || Siding Spring || SSS || EUN || align=right | 2.9 km || 
|-id=700 bgcolor=#E9E9E9
| 117700 ||  || — || March 10, 2005 || Anderson Mesa || LONEOS || — || align=right | 1.6 km || 
|}

117701–117800 

|-bgcolor=#fefefe
| 117701 ||  || — || March 10, 2005 || Catalina || CSS || — || align=right | 1.7 km || 
|-id=702 bgcolor=#E9E9E9
| 117702 ||  || — || March 3, 2005 || Kitt Peak || Spacewatch || AST || align=right | 3.9 km || 
|-id=703 bgcolor=#d6d6d6
| 117703 Ochoa ||  ||  || March 11, 2005 || Kitt Peak || M. W. Buie || KOR || align=right | 1.5 km || 
|-id=704 bgcolor=#E9E9E9
| 117704 Lopez-Alegria ||  ||  || March 12, 2005 || Kitt Peak || M. W. Buie || — || align=right | 1.3 km || 
|-id=705 bgcolor=#E9E9E9
| 117705 ||  || — || March 18, 2005 || Catalina || CSS || — || align=right | 2.4 km || 
|-id=706 bgcolor=#FA8072
| 117706 ||  || — || March 18, 2005 || Catalina || CSS || H || align=right | 1.8 km || 
|-id=707 bgcolor=#E9E9E9
| 117707 ||  || — || March 31, 2005 || Anderson Mesa || LONEOS || HNS || align=right | 2.9 km || 
|-id=708 bgcolor=#d6d6d6
| 117708 ||  || — || March 30, 2005 || Goodricke-Pigott || P. Kumar || EOS || align=right | 3.5 km || 
|-id=709 bgcolor=#d6d6d6
| 117709 ||  || — || March 30, 2005 || Catalina || CSS || — || align=right | 4.5 km || 
|-id=710 bgcolor=#d6d6d6
| 117710 ||  || — || March 31, 2005 || Anderson Mesa || LONEOS || — || align=right | 6.9 km || 
|-id=711 bgcolor=#E9E9E9
| 117711 Degenfeld || 2005 GA ||  || April 1, 2005 || Piszkéstető || K. Sárneczky || — || align=right | 2.0 km || 
|-id=712 bgcolor=#fefefe
| 117712 Podmaniczky || 2005 GD ||  || April 1, 2005 || Piszkéstető || K. Sárneczky || NYS || align=right | 1.4 km || 
|-id=713 bgcolor=#fefefe
| 117713 Kövesligethy ||  ||  || April 2, 2005 || Piszkéstető || K. Sárneczky || NYS || align=right data-sort-value="0.97" | 970 m || 
|-id=714 bgcolor=#d6d6d6
| 117714 Kiskartal ||  ||  || April 2, 2005 || Piszkéstető || K. Sárneczky || EOS || align=right | 3.3 km || 
|-id=715 bgcolor=#d6d6d6
| 117715 Carlkirby ||  ||  || April 2, 2005 || New Mexico Skies || R. Hutsebaut || EOS || align=right | 8.3 km || 
|-id=716 bgcolor=#E9E9E9
| 117716 ||  || — || April 1, 2005 || Anderson Mesa || LONEOS || — || align=right | 6.2 km || 
|-id=717 bgcolor=#E9E9E9
| 117717 ||  || — || April 1, 2005 || Kitt Peak || Spacewatch || — || align=right | 6.2 km || 
|-id=718 bgcolor=#fefefe
| 117718 ||  || — || April 1, 2005 || Kitt Peak || Spacewatch || — || align=right | 1.2 km || 
|-id=719 bgcolor=#fefefe
| 117719 ||  || — || April 1, 2005 || Anderson Mesa || LONEOS || — || align=right | 1.7 km || 
|-id=720 bgcolor=#E9E9E9
| 117720 ||  || — || April 2, 2005 || Mount Lemmon || Mount Lemmon Survey || — || align=right | 2.4 km || 
|-id=721 bgcolor=#fefefe
| 117721 ||  || — || April 2, 2005 || Anderson Mesa || LONEOS || — || align=right | 1.7 km || 
|-id=722 bgcolor=#fefefe
| 117722 ||  || — || April 1, 2005 || Anderson Mesa || LONEOS || V || align=right | 1.1 km || 
|-id=723 bgcolor=#fefefe
| 117723 ||  || — || April 1, 2005 || Anderson Mesa || LONEOS || FLO || align=right | 1.1 km || 
|-id=724 bgcolor=#fefefe
| 117724 ||  || — || April 1, 2005 || Anderson Mesa || LONEOS || — || align=right | 1.6 km || 
|-id=725 bgcolor=#fefefe
| 117725 ||  || — || April 1, 2005 || Anderson Mesa || LONEOS || — || align=right | 2.8 km || 
|-id=726 bgcolor=#E9E9E9
| 117726 ||  || — || April 1, 2005 || Anderson Mesa || LONEOS || EUN || align=right | 2.1 km || 
|-id=727 bgcolor=#E9E9E9
| 117727 ||  || — || April 1, 2005 || Anderson Mesa || LONEOS || — || align=right | 2.3 km || 
|-id=728 bgcolor=#E9E9E9
| 117728 ||  || — || April 1, 2005 || Anderson Mesa || LONEOS || GEF || align=right | 2.4 km || 
|-id=729 bgcolor=#E9E9E9
| 117729 ||  || — || April 1, 2005 || Anderson Mesa || LONEOS || EUN || align=right | 1.9 km || 
|-id=730 bgcolor=#d6d6d6
| 117730 ||  || — || April 2, 2005 || Mount Lemmon || Mount Lemmon Survey || — || align=right | 5.2 km || 
|-id=731 bgcolor=#E9E9E9
| 117731 ||  || — || April 2, 2005 || Mount Lemmon || Mount Lemmon Survey || — || align=right | 4.8 km || 
|-id=732 bgcolor=#E9E9E9
| 117732 ||  || — || April 2, 2005 || Mount Lemmon || Mount Lemmon Survey || — || align=right | 2.4 km || 
|-id=733 bgcolor=#E9E9E9
| 117733 ||  || — || April 2, 2005 || Anderson Mesa || LONEOS || EUN || align=right | 3.4 km || 
|-id=734 bgcolor=#fefefe
| 117734 ||  || — || April 2, 2005 || Anderson Mesa || LONEOS || — || align=right | 1.1 km || 
|-id=735 bgcolor=#E9E9E9
| 117735 ||  || — || April 2, 2005 || Mount Lemmon || Mount Lemmon Survey || — || align=right | 2.6 km || 
|-id=736 bgcolor=#E9E9E9
| 117736 Sherrod ||  ||  || April 4, 2005 || Vicques || M. Ory || — || align=right | 4.8 km || 
|-id=737 bgcolor=#fefefe
| 117737 ||  || — || April 1, 2005 || Anderson Mesa || LONEOS || V || align=right | 1.3 km || 
|-id=738 bgcolor=#E9E9E9
| 117738 ||  || — || April 2, 2005 || Anderson Mesa || LONEOS || — || align=right | 2.8 km || 
|-id=739 bgcolor=#E9E9E9
| 117739 ||  || — || April 4, 2005 || Kitt Peak || Spacewatch || — || align=right | 5.0 km || 
|-id=740 bgcolor=#fefefe
| 117740 ||  || — || April 4, 2005 || Kitt Peak || Spacewatch || — || align=right | 1.2 km || 
|-id=741 bgcolor=#E9E9E9
| 117741 ||  || — || April 4, 2005 || Catalina || CSS || — || align=right | 3.8 km || 
|-id=742 bgcolor=#fefefe
| 117742 ||  || — || April 4, 2005 || Socorro || LINEAR || V || align=right | 1.4 km || 
|-id=743 bgcolor=#fefefe
| 117743 ||  || — || April 4, 2005 || Socorro || LINEAR || NYS || align=right | 1.1 km || 
|-id=744 bgcolor=#fefefe
| 117744 ||  || — || April 4, 2005 || Kitt Peak || Spacewatch || — || align=right | 1.3 km || 
|-id=745 bgcolor=#fefefe
| 117745 ||  || — || April 2, 2005 || Siding Spring || SSS || CIM || align=right | 4.3 km || 
|-id=746 bgcolor=#fefefe
| 117746 ||  || — || April 2, 2005 || Siding Spring || SSS || FLO || align=right | 1.4 km || 
|-id=747 bgcolor=#fefefe
| 117747 ||  || — || April 5, 2005 || Anderson Mesa || LONEOS || — || align=right | 2.8 km || 
|-id=748 bgcolor=#E9E9E9
| 117748 ||  || — || April 5, 2005 || Anderson Mesa || LONEOS || — || align=right | 5.8 km || 
|-id=749 bgcolor=#E9E9E9
| 117749 ||  || — || April 5, 2005 || Mount Lemmon || Mount Lemmon Survey || — || align=right | 2.2 km || 
|-id=750 bgcolor=#fefefe
| 117750 ||  || — || April 5, 2005 || Mount Lemmon || Mount Lemmon Survey || MAS || align=right | 1.1 km || 
|-id=751 bgcolor=#E9E9E9
| 117751 ||  || — || April 5, 2005 || Mount Lemmon || Mount Lemmon Survey || — || align=right | 1.9 km || 
|-id=752 bgcolor=#d6d6d6
| 117752 ||  || — || April 7, 2005 || New Mexico Skies || A. Lowe || ALA || align=right | 6.1 km || 
|-id=753 bgcolor=#E9E9E9
| 117753 ||  || — || April 4, 2005 || Mount Lemmon || Mount Lemmon Survey || — || align=right | 2.6 km || 
|-id=754 bgcolor=#E9E9E9
| 117754 ||  || — || April 4, 2005 || Socorro || LINEAR || — || align=right | 4.2 km || 
|-id=755 bgcolor=#fefefe
| 117755 ||  || — || April 6, 2005 || Mount Lemmon || Mount Lemmon Survey || — || align=right | 1.3 km || 
|-id=756 bgcolor=#fefefe
| 117756 ||  || — || April 1, 2005 || Anderson Mesa || LONEOS || — || align=right | 1.6 km || 
|-id=757 bgcolor=#E9E9E9
| 117757 ||  || — || April 5, 2005 || Catalina || CSS || GEF || align=right | 2.4 km || 
|-id=758 bgcolor=#d6d6d6
| 117758 ||  || — || April 4, 2005 || Catalina || CSS || — || align=right | 3.3 km || 
|-id=759 bgcolor=#fefefe
| 117759 ||  || — || April 6, 2005 || Anderson Mesa || LONEOS || FLO || align=right | 1.2 km || 
|-id=760 bgcolor=#d6d6d6
| 117760 ||  || — || April 2, 2005 || Catalina || CSS || — || align=right | 5.7 km || 
|-id=761 bgcolor=#d6d6d6
| 117761 ||  || — || April 2, 2005 || Palomar || NEAT || KAR || align=right | 2.1 km || 
|-id=762 bgcolor=#E9E9E9
| 117762 ||  || — || April 2, 2005 || Palomar || NEAT || — || align=right | 1.7 km || 
|-id=763 bgcolor=#fefefe
| 117763 ||  || — || April 4, 2005 || Catalina || CSS || — || align=right | 1.6 km || 
|-id=764 bgcolor=#d6d6d6
| 117764 ||  || — || April 4, 2005 || Catalina || CSS || — || align=right | 5.4 km || 
|-id=765 bgcolor=#fefefe
| 117765 ||  || — || April 5, 2005 || Anderson Mesa || LONEOS || — || align=right | 1.3 km || 
|-id=766 bgcolor=#E9E9E9
| 117766 ||  || — || April 6, 2005 || Catalina || CSS || JUN || align=right | 2.9 km || 
|-id=767 bgcolor=#E9E9E9
| 117767 ||  || — || April 6, 2005 || Catalina || CSS || — || align=right | 2.0 km || 
|-id=768 bgcolor=#fefefe
| 117768 ||  || — || April 1, 2005 || Catalina || CSS || H || align=right | 1.2 km || 
|-id=769 bgcolor=#fefefe
| 117769 ||  || — || April 4, 2005 || Socorro || LINEAR || NYS || align=right | 1.1 km || 
|-id=770 bgcolor=#fefefe
| 117770 ||  || — || April 5, 2005 || Palomar || NEAT || — || align=right | 1.2 km || 
|-id=771 bgcolor=#E9E9E9
| 117771 ||  || — || April 6, 2005 || Anderson Mesa || LONEOS || — || align=right | 4.9 km || 
|-id=772 bgcolor=#fefefe
| 117772 ||  || — || April 6, 2005 || Socorro || LINEAR || — || align=right | 1.8 km || 
|-id=773 bgcolor=#fefefe
| 117773 ||  || — || April 7, 2005 || Anderson Mesa || LONEOS || H || align=right data-sort-value="0.95" | 950 m || 
|-id=774 bgcolor=#E9E9E9
| 117774 ||  || — || April 7, 2005 || Mount Lemmon || Mount Lemmon Survey || — || align=right | 3.6 km || 
|-id=775 bgcolor=#fefefe
| 117775 ||  || — || April 9, 2005 || Socorro || LINEAR || — || align=right | 2.2 km || 
|-id=776 bgcolor=#fefefe
| 117776 ||  || — || April 9, 2005 || Kitt Peak || Spacewatch || NYS || align=right data-sort-value="0.85" | 850 m || 
|-id=777 bgcolor=#E9E9E9
| 117777 ||  || — || April 6, 2005 || Anderson Mesa || LONEOS || — || align=right | 3.9 km || 
|-id=778 bgcolor=#d6d6d6
| 117778 ||  || — || April 6, 2005 || Kitt Peak || Spacewatch || — || align=right | 5.3 km || 
|-id=779 bgcolor=#d6d6d6
| 117779 ||  || — || April 6, 2005 || Catalina || CSS || — || align=right | 6.1 km || 
|-id=780 bgcolor=#E9E9E9
| 117780 ||  || — || April 9, 2005 || Socorro || LINEAR || — || align=right | 2.1 km || 
|-id=781 bgcolor=#E9E9E9
| 117781 Jamesfisher ||  ||  || April 10, 2005 || Mount Lemmon || Mount Lemmon Survey || NEM || align=right | 4.4 km || 
|-id=782 bgcolor=#d6d6d6
| 117782 ||  || — || April 10, 2005 || Kitt Peak || Spacewatch || VER || align=right | 4.7 km || 
|-id=783 bgcolor=#d6d6d6
| 117783 ||  || — || April 11, 2005 || Mount Lemmon || Mount Lemmon Survey || — || align=right | 6.3 km || 
|-id=784 bgcolor=#E9E9E9
| 117784 ||  || — || April 11, 2005 || Anderson Mesa || LONEOS || HEN || align=right | 2.2 km || 
|-id=785 bgcolor=#fefefe
| 117785 ||  || — || April 5, 2005 || Mount Lemmon || Mount Lemmon Survey || MAS || align=right | 1.1 km || 
|-id=786 bgcolor=#fefefe
| 117786 ||  || — || April 5, 2005 || Kitt Peak || Spacewatch || FLO || align=right | 1.1 km || 
|-id=787 bgcolor=#E9E9E9
| 117787 ||  || — || April 7, 2005 || Kitt Peak || Spacewatch || — || align=right | 3.2 km || 
|-id=788 bgcolor=#d6d6d6
| 117788 ||  || — || April 8, 2005 || Socorro || LINEAR || — || align=right | 4.3 km || 
|-id=789 bgcolor=#d6d6d6
| 117789 ||  || — || April 12, 2005 || Anderson Mesa || LONEOS || EOS || align=right | 5.8 km || 
|-id=790 bgcolor=#d6d6d6
| 117790 ||  || — || April 13, 2005 || New Mexico Skies || A. Lowe || — || align=right | 4.5 km || 
|-id=791 bgcolor=#d6d6d6
| 117791 ||  || — || April 1, 2005 || Catalina || CSS || EUP || align=right | 6.6 km || 
|-id=792 bgcolor=#fefefe
| 117792 ||  || — || April 10, 2005 || Kitt Peak || Spacewatch || NYS || align=right | 1.2 km || 
|-id=793 bgcolor=#fefefe
| 117793 ||  || — || April 10, 2005 || Mount Lemmon || Mount Lemmon Survey || MAS || align=right | 1.2 km || 
|-id=794 bgcolor=#d6d6d6
| 117794 ||  || — || April 12, 2005 || Socorro || LINEAR || HYG || align=right | 5.9 km || 
|-id=795 bgcolor=#fefefe
| 117795 ||  || — || April 13, 2005 || Socorro || LINEAR || — || align=right | 1.5 km || 
|-id=796 bgcolor=#E9E9E9
| 117796 ||  || — || April 14, 2005 || Reedy Creek || J. Broughton || — || align=right | 2.4 km || 
|-id=797 bgcolor=#fefefe
| 117797 ||  || — || April 14, 2005 || Reedy Creek || J. Broughton || — || align=right | 1.8 km || 
|-id=798 bgcolor=#E9E9E9
| 117798 ||  || — || April 11, 2005 || Kitt Peak || Spacewatch || — || align=right | 4.4 km || 
|-id=799 bgcolor=#E9E9E9
| 117799 ||  || — || April 12, 2005 || Kitt Peak || Spacewatch || NEM || align=right | 4.3 km || 
|-id=800 bgcolor=#E9E9E9
| 117800 ||  || — || April 13, 2005 || Socorro || LINEAR || — || align=right | 4.3 km || 
|}

117801–117900 

|-bgcolor=#fefefe
| 117801 ||  || — || April 11, 2005 || Mount Lemmon || Mount Lemmon Survey || MAS || align=right | 1.3 km || 
|-id=802 bgcolor=#fefefe
| 117802 ||  || — || April 11, 2005 || Mount Lemmon || Mount Lemmon Survey || MAS || align=right | 1.0 km || 
|-id=803 bgcolor=#fefefe
| 117803 ||  || — || April 11, 2005 || Mount Lemmon || Mount Lemmon Survey || FLO || align=right | 1.4 km || 
|-id=804 bgcolor=#fefefe
| 117804 ||  || — || April 11, 2005 || Siding Spring || SSS || H || align=right | 1.3 km || 
|-id=805 bgcolor=#fefefe
| 117805 ||  || — || April 12, 2005 || Socorro || LINEAR || — || align=right | 1.7 km || 
|-id=806 bgcolor=#E9E9E9
| 117806 ||  || — || April 13, 2005 || Socorro || LINEAR || — || align=right | 1.9 km || 
|-id=807 bgcolor=#E9E9E9
| 117807 ||  || — || April 14, 2005 || Catalina || CSS || NEM || align=right | 5.0 km || 
|-id=808 bgcolor=#E9E9E9
| 117808 ||  || — || April 15, 2005 || Catalina || CSS || — || align=right | 4.3 km || 
|-id=809 bgcolor=#E9E9E9
| 117809 ||  || — || April 15, 2005 || Anderson Mesa || LONEOS || — || align=right | 3.9 km || 
|-id=810 bgcolor=#E9E9E9
| 117810 ||  || — || April 15, 2005 || Kitt Peak || Spacewatch || HOF || align=right | 6.1 km || 
|-id=811 bgcolor=#E9E9E9
| 117811 ||  || — || April 12, 2005 || Kitt Peak || Spacewatch || HEN || align=right | 1.9 km || 
|-id=812 bgcolor=#E9E9E9
| 117812 ||  || — || April 15, 2005 || Catalina || CSS || — || align=right | 7.3 km || 
|-id=813 bgcolor=#E9E9E9
| 117813 ||  || — || April 17, 2005 || Siding Spring || SSS || ADE || align=right | 6.1 km || 
|-id=814 bgcolor=#E9E9E9
| 117814 ||  || — || April 30, 2005 || New Mexico Skies || A. Lowe || — || align=right | 4.5 km || 
|-id=815 bgcolor=#fefefe
| 117815 ||  || — || April 30, 2005 || Campo Imperatore || CINEOS || NYS || align=right | 1.3 km || 
|-id=816 bgcolor=#E9E9E9
| 117816 ||  || — || April 28, 2005 || Siding Spring || SSS || EUN || align=right | 2.1 km || 
|-id=817 bgcolor=#E9E9E9
| 117817 ||  || — || May 3, 2005 || Socorro || LINEAR || — || align=right | 1.9 km || 
|-id=818 bgcolor=#E9E9E9
| 117818 ||  || — || May 1, 2005 || Siding Spring || SSS || — || align=right | 5.6 km || 
|-id=819 bgcolor=#fefefe
| 117819 ||  || — || May 3, 2005 || Catalina || CSS || V || align=right | 1.2 km || 
|-id=820 bgcolor=#d6d6d6
| 117820 ||  || — || May 4, 2005 || Kitt Peak || Spacewatch || — || align=right | 5.3 km || 
|-id=821 bgcolor=#fefefe
| 117821 ||  || — || May 4, 2005 || Catalina || CSS || — || align=right | 1.9 km || 
|-id=822 bgcolor=#d6d6d6
| 117822 ||  || — || May 4, 2005 || Catalina || CSS || EUP || align=right | 11 km || 
|-id=823 bgcolor=#fefefe
| 117823 ||  || — || May 3, 2005 || Kitt Peak || Spacewatch || — || align=right | 2.4 km || 
|-id=824 bgcolor=#E9E9E9
| 117824 ||  || — || May 3, 2005 || Catalina || CSS || — || align=right | 2.7 km || 
|-id=825 bgcolor=#E9E9E9
| 117825 ||  || — || May 3, 2005 || Socorro || LINEAR || — || align=right | 3.8 km || 
|-id=826 bgcolor=#E9E9E9
| 117826 ||  || — || May 4, 2005 || Anderson Mesa || LONEOS || — || align=right | 4.2 km || 
|-id=827 bgcolor=#fefefe
| 117827 ||  || — || May 4, 2005 || Socorro || LINEAR || — || align=right | 1.4 km || 
|-id=828 bgcolor=#d6d6d6
| 117828 ||  || — || May 4, 2005 || Socorro || LINEAR || — || align=right | 4.5 km || 
|-id=829 bgcolor=#d6d6d6
| 117829 ||  || — || May 7, 2005 || Kitt Peak || Spacewatch || K-2 || align=right | 2.6 km || 
|-id=830 bgcolor=#fefefe
| 117830 ||  || — || May 7, 2005 || Mount Lemmon || Mount Lemmon Survey || — || align=right | 1.2 km || 
|-id=831 bgcolor=#E9E9E9
| 117831 ||  || — || May 3, 2005 || Kitt Peak || Spacewatch || — || align=right | 2.4 km || 
|-id=832 bgcolor=#C2FFFF
| 117832 ||  || — || May 4, 2005 || Kitt Peak || Spacewatch || L4 || align=right | 14 km || 
|-id=833 bgcolor=#d6d6d6
| 117833 ||  || — || May 4, 2005 || Palomar || NEAT || KOR || align=right | 2.6 km || 
|-id=834 bgcolor=#E9E9E9
| 117834 ||  || — || May 8, 2005 || Socorro || LINEAR || — || align=right | 1.7 km || 
|-id=835 bgcolor=#E9E9E9
| 117835 ||  || — || May 8, 2005 || Socorro || LINEAR || RAF || align=right | 1.7 km || 
|-id=836 bgcolor=#E9E9E9
| 117836 ||  || — || May 8, 2005 || Siding Spring || SSS || — || align=right | 2.5 km || 
|-id=837 bgcolor=#E9E9E9
| 117837 ||  || — || May 4, 2005 || Palomar || NEAT || — || align=right | 4.9 km || 
|-id=838 bgcolor=#d6d6d6
| 117838 ||  || — || May 6, 2005 || Socorro || LINEAR || — || align=right | 3.5 km || 
|-id=839 bgcolor=#fefefe
| 117839 ||  || — || May 8, 2005 || Siding Spring || SSS || NYS || align=right | 1.1 km || 
|-id=840 bgcolor=#E9E9E9
| 117840 ||  || — || May 11, 2005 || Palomar || NEAT || — || align=right | 4.6 km || 
|-id=841 bgcolor=#fefefe
| 117841 ||  || — || May 8, 2005 || Anderson Mesa || LONEOS || — || align=right | 1.4 km || 
|-id=842 bgcolor=#fefefe
| 117842 ||  || — || May 15, 2005 || Reedy Creek || J. Broughton || — || align=right | 1.6 km || 
|-id=843 bgcolor=#fefefe
| 117843 ||  || — || May 11, 2005 || Palomar || NEAT || V || align=right | 1.2 km || 
|-id=844 bgcolor=#E9E9E9
| 117844 ||  || — || May 11, 2005 || Kitt Peak || Spacewatch || GAL || align=right | 3.0 km || 
|-id=845 bgcolor=#fefefe
| 117845 ||  || — || May 12, 2005 || Catalina || CSS || FLO || align=right | 1.1 km || 
|-id=846 bgcolor=#E9E9E9
| 117846 ||  || — || May 12, 2005 || Socorro || LINEAR || — || align=right | 2.5 km || 
|-id=847 bgcolor=#fefefe
| 117847 ||  || — || May 13, 2005 || Siding Spring || SSS || — || align=right | 1.9 km || 
|-id=848 bgcolor=#E9E9E9
| 117848 ||  || — || May 9, 2005 || Catalina || CSS || — || align=right | 2.2 km || 
|-id=849 bgcolor=#E9E9E9
| 117849 ||  || — || May 14, 2005 || Kitt Peak || Spacewatch || — || align=right | 2.0 km || 
|-id=850 bgcolor=#E9E9E9
| 117850 ||  || — || May 3, 2005 || Kitt Peak || Spacewatch || — || align=right | 2.7 km || 
|-id=851 bgcolor=#C2FFFF
| 117851 ||  || — || May 3, 2005 || Catalina || CSS || L4 || align=right | 17 km || 
|-id=852 bgcolor=#E9E9E9
| 117852 Constance ||  ||  || May 3, 2005 || Catalina || CSS || — || align=right | 4.3 km || 
|-id=853 bgcolor=#fefefe
| 117853 ||  || — || May 3, 2005 || Socorro || LINEAR || FLO || align=right | 1.3 km || 
|-id=854 bgcolor=#fefefe
| 117854 ||  || — || May 4, 2005 || Mount Lemmon || Mount Lemmon Survey || V || align=right data-sort-value="0.95" | 950 m || 
|-id=855 bgcolor=#E9E9E9
| 117855 ||  || — || May 12, 2005 || Socorro || LINEAR || — || align=right | 2.6 km || 
|-id=856 bgcolor=#fefefe
| 117856 ||  || — || May 18, 2005 || Palomar || NEAT || — || align=right | 1.8 km || 
|-id=857 bgcolor=#d6d6d6
| 117857 ||  || — || May 19, 2005 || Catalina || CSS || URS || align=right | 5.0 km || 
|-id=858 bgcolor=#E9E9E9
| 117858 ||  || — || May 30, 2005 || New Mexico Skies || A. Lowe || — || align=right | 3.7 km || 
|-id=859 bgcolor=#fefefe
| 117859 ||  || — || May 29, 2005 || Reedy Creek || J. Broughton || — || align=right | 1.5 km || 
|-id=860 bgcolor=#E9E9E9
| 117860 || 2005 LY || — || June 1, 2005 || New Mexico Skies || A. Lowe || — || align=right | 2.5 km || 
|-id=861 bgcolor=#E9E9E9
| 117861 ||  || — || June 1, 2005 || Kitt Peak || Spacewatch || — || align=right | 2.8 km || 
|-id=862 bgcolor=#fefefe
| 117862 ||  || — || June 3, 2005 || Catalina || CSS || — || align=right | 1.2 km || 
|-id=863 bgcolor=#fefefe
| 117863 || 2028 P-L || — || September 24, 1960 || Palomar || PLS || — || align=right | 1.7 km || 
|-id=864 bgcolor=#E9E9E9
| 117864 || 2069 P-L || — || September 24, 1960 || Palomar || PLS || — || align=right | 4.0 km || 
|-id=865 bgcolor=#E9E9E9
| 117865 || 2081 P-L || — || September 24, 1960 || Palomar || PLS || — || align=right | 1.9 km || 
|-id=866 bgcolor=#fefefe
| 117866 || 2105 P-L || — || September 24, 1960 || Palomar || PLS || — || align=right | 1.7 km || 
|-id=867 bgcolor=#d6d6d6
| 117867 || 2127 P-L || — || September 24, 1960 || Palomar || PLS || — || align=right | 4.2 km || 
|-id=868 bgcolor=#E9E9E9
| 117868 || 2147 P-L || — || September 24, 1960 || Palomar || PLS || — || align=right | 2.2 km || 
|-id=869 bgcolor=#fefefe
| 117869 || 2168 P-L || — || September 26, 1960 || Palomar || PLS || FLO || align=right | 1.0 km || 
|-id=870 bgcolor=#E9E9E9
| 117870 || 2174 P-L || — || September 24, 1960 || Palomar || PLS || — || align=right | 2.9 km || 
|-id=871 bgcolor=#E9E9E9
| 117871 || 2186 P-L || — || September 24, 1960 || Palomar || PLS || EUN || align=right | 2.3 km || 
|-id=872 bgcolor=#fefefe
| 117872 || 2210 P-L || — || September 24, 1960 || Palomar || PLS || NYS || align=right | 1.1 km || 
|-id=873 bgcolor=#fefefe
| 117873 || 2212 P-L || — || September 24, 1960 || Palomar || PLS || — || align=right | 1.3 km || 
|-id=874 bgcolor=#fefefe
| 117874 Picodelteide || 2511 P-L ||  || September 26, 1960 || Palomar || PLS || H || align=right | 1.4 km || 
|-id=875 bgcolor=#d6d6d6
| 117875 || 2539 P-L || — || September 24, 1960 || Palomar || PLS || HYG || align=right | 5.7 km || 
|-id=876 bgcolor=#fefefe
| 117876 || 2586 P-L || — || September 24, 1960 || Palomar || PLS || NYS || align=right | 2.6 km || 
|-id=877 bgcolor=#fefefe
| 117877 || 2593 P-L || — || September 24, 1960 || Palomar || PLS || — || align=right | 1.4 km || 
|-id=878 bgcolor=#d6d6d6
| 117878 || 2602 P-L || — || September 24, 1960 || Palomar || PLS || — || align=right | 6.5 km || 
|-id=879 bgcolor=#fefefe
| 117879 || 2621 P-L || — || September 24, 1960 || Palomar || PLS || V || align=right | 1.1 km || 
|-id=880 bgcolor=#E9E9E9
| 117880 || 2651 P-L || — || September 24, 1960 || Palomar || PLS || — || align=right | 1.9 km || 
|-id=881 bgcolor=#E9E9E9
| 117881 || 2675 P-L || — || September 26, 1960 || Palomar || PLS || — || align=right | 3.8 km || 
|-id=882 bgcolor=#E9E9E9
| 117882 || 2680 P-L || — || September 24, 1960 || Palomar || PLS || — || align=right | 2.7 km || 
|-id=883 bgcolor=#d6d6d6
| 117883 || 2682 P-L || — || September 24, 1960 || Palomar || PLS || THM || align=right | 4.6 km || 
|-id=884 bgcolor=#E9E9E9
| 117884 || 2684 P-L || — || September 24, 1960 || Palomar || PLS || — || align=right | 1.9 km || 
|-id=885 bgcolor=#d6d6d6
| 117885 || 2692 P-L || — || September 24, 1960 || Palomar || PLS || HYG || align=right | 6.3 km || 
|-id=886 bgcolor=#fefefe
| 117886 || 2694 P-L || — || September 24, 1960 || Palomar || PLS || — || align=right | 1.4 km || 
|-id=887 bgcolor=#d6d6d6
| 117887 || 2721 P-L || — || September 24, 1960 || Palomar || PLS || K-2 || align=right | 2.5 km || 
|-id=888 bgcolor=#fefefe
| 117888 || 2735 P-L || — || September 24, 1960 || Palomar || PLS || NYS || align=right | 1.4 km || 
|-id=889 bgcolor=#fefefe
| 117889 || 2745 P-L || — || September 24, 1960 || Palomar || PLS || FLO || align=right | 1.2 km || 
|-id=890 bgcolor=#E9E9E9
| 117890 || 2748 P-L || — || September 24, 1960 || Palomar || PLS || RAF || align=right | 1.9 km || 
|-id=891 bgcolor=#fefefe
| 117891 || 2750 P-L || — || September 24, 1960 || Palomar || PLS || — || align=right | 1.2 km || 
|-id=892 bgcolor=#E9E9E9
| 117892 || 2753 P-L || — || September 24, 1960 || Palomar || PLS || — || align=right | 2.5 km || 
|-id=893 bgcolor=#fefefe
| 117893 || 2781 P-L || — || September 26, 1960 || Palomar || PLS || — || align=right | 2.2 km || 
|-id=894 bgcolor=#E9E9E9
| 117894 || 2791 P-L || — || September 26, 1960 || Palomar || PLS || — || align=right | 2.4 km || 
|-id=895 bgcolor=#E9E9E9
| 117895 || 2802 P-L || — || September 24, 1960 || Palomar || PLS || JUN || align=right | 1.5 km || 
|-id=896 bgcolor=#fefefe
| 117896 || 2815 P-L || — || September 24, 1960 || Palomar || PLS || NYS || align=right | 1.2 km || 
|-id=897 bgcolor=#d6d6d6
| 117897 || 2845 P-L || — || September 24, 1960 || Palomar || PLS || — || align=right | 3.9 km || 
|-id=898 bgcolor=#FA8072
| 117898 || 3029 P-L || — || September 24, 1960 || Palomar || PLS || — || align=right | 1.4 km || 
|-id=899 bgcolor=#d6d6d6
| 117899 || 3048 P-L || — || September 24, 1960 || Palomar || PLS || TIR || align=right | 6.2 km || 
|-id=900 bgcolor=#fefefe
| 117900 || 3053 P-L || — || September 24, 1960 || Palomar || PLS || — || align=right | 1.9 km || 
|}

117901–118000 

|-bgcolor=#E9E9E9
| 117901 || 3055 P-L || — || September 24, 1960 || Palomar || PLS || BAR || align=right | 2.7 km || 
|-id=902 bgcolor=#E9E9E9
| 117902 || 3058 P-L || — || September 25, 1960 || Palomar || PLS || CLO || align=right | 3.4 km || 
|-id=903 bgcolor=#E9E9E9
| 117903 || 3115 P-L || — || September 24, 1960 || Palomar || PLS || — || align=right | 3.3 km || 
|-id=904 bgcolor=#E9E9E9
| 117904 || 3504 P-L || — || October 17, 1960 || Palomar || PLS || — || align=right | 4.2 km || 
|-id=905 bgcolor=#E9E9E9
| 117905 || 3543 P-L || — || October 17, 1960 || Palomar || PLS || EUN || align=right | 2.9 km || 
|-id=906 bgcolor=#fefefe
| 117906 || 4046 P-L || — || September 24, 1960 || Palomar || PLS || ERI || align=right | 2.9 km || 
|-id=907 bgcolor=#d6d6d6
| 117907 || 4076 P-L || — || September 24, 1960 || Palomar || PLS || NAE || align=right | 6.6 km || 
|-id=908 bgcolor=#fefefe
| 117908 || 4104 P-L || — || September 24, 1960 || Palomar || PLS || V || align=right | 1.4 km || 
|-id=909 bgcolor=#E9E9E9
| 117909 || 4123 P-L || — || September 24, 1960 || Palomar || PLS || MIT || align=right | 3.5 km || 
|-id=910 bgcolor=#E9E9E9
| 117910 || 4130 P-L || — || September 24, 1960 || Palomar || PLS || — || align=right | 3.4 km || 
|-id=911 bgcolor=#fefefe
| 117911 || 4138 P-L || — || September 24, 1960 || Palomar || PLS || FLO || align=right | 1.2 km || 
|-id=912 bgcolor=#fefefe
| 117912 || 4171 P-L || — || September 24, 1960 || Palomar || PLS || FLO || align=right | 1.1 km || 
|-id=913 bgcolor=#E9E9E9
| 117913 || 4211 P-L || — || September 24, 1960 || Palomar || PLS || — || align=right | 1.7 km || 
|-id=914 bgcolor=#d6d6d6
| 117914 || 4225 P-L || — || September 24, 1960 || Palomar || PLS || — || align=right | 4.8 km || 
|-id=915 bgcolor=#fefefe
| 117915 || 4227 P-L || — || September 24, 1960 || Palomar || PLS || — || align=right | 1.0 km || 
|-id=916 bgcolor=#E9E9E9
| 117916 || 4271 P-L || — || September 24, 1960 || Palomar || PLS || — || align=right | 4.4 km || 
|-id=917 bgcolor=#d6d6d6
| 117917 || 4281 P-L || — || September 24, 1960 || Palomar || PLS || — || align=right | 4.3 km || 
|-id=918 bgcolor=#d6d6d6
| 117918 || 4320 P-L || — || September 24, 1960 || Palomar || PLS || — || align=right | 5.8 km || 
|-id=919 bgcolor=#fefefe
| 117919 || 4537 P-L || — || September 24, 1960 || Palomar || PLS || FLO || align=right | 1.8 km || 
|-id=920 bgcolor=#fefefe
| 117920 || 4546 P-L || — || September 24, 1960 || Palomar || PLS || — || align=right | 1.5 km || 
|-id=921 bgcolor=#fefefe
| 117921 || 4621 P-L || — || September 24, 1960 || Palomar || PLS || MAS || align=right | 1.3 km || 
|-id=922 bgcolor=#E9E9E9
| 117922 || 4622 P-L || — || September 24, 1960 || Palomar || PLS || EUN || align=right | 2.5 km || 
|-id=923 bgcolor=#fefefe
| 117923 || 4660 P-L || — || September 24, 1960 || Palomar || PLS || — || align=right | 2.2 km || 
|-id=924 bgcolor=#fefefe
| 117924 || 4699 P-L || — || September 24, 1960 || Palomar || PLS || FLO || align=right data-sort-value="0.98" | 980 m || 
|-id=925 bgcolor=#fefefe
| 117925 || 4701 P-L || — || September 24, 1960 || Palomar || PLS || — || align=right | 1.7 km || 
|-id=926 bgcolor=#d6d6d6
| 117926 || 4703 P-L || — || September 24, 1960 || Palomar || PLS || — || align=right | 6.5 km || 
|-id=927 bgcolor=#fefefe
| 117927 || 4739 P-L || — || September 24, 1960 || Palomar || PLS || — || align=right | 1.6 km || 
|-id=928 bgcolor=#fefefe
| 117928 || 4741 P-L || — || September 24, 1960 || Palomar || PLS || — || align=right | 1.9 km || 
|-id=929 bgcolor=#fefefe
| 117929 || 4742 P-L || — || September 24, 1960 || Palomar || PLS || NYS || align=right | 2.9 km || 
|-id=930 bgcolor=#fefefe
| 117930 || 4747 P-L || — || September 24, 1960 || Palomar || PLS || V || align=right | 1.0 km || 
|-id=931 bgcolor=#d6d6d6
| 117931 || 4776 P-L || — || September 24, 1960 || Palomar || PLS || THM || align=right | 4.7 km || 
|-id=932 bgcolor=#E9E9E9
| 117932 || 4781 P-L || — || September 24, 1960 || Palomar || PLS || MRX || align=right | 2.0 km || 
|-id=933 bgcolor=#fefefe
| 117933 || 4808 P-L || — || September 24, 1960 || Palomar || PLS || — || align=right | 1.4 km || 
|-id=934 bgcolor=#fefefe
| 117934 || 4809 P-L || — || September 24, 1960 || Palomar || PLS || NYS || align=right | 2.3 km || 
|-id=935 bgcolor=#E9E9E9
| 117935 || 4863 P-L || — || September 24, 1960 || Palomar || PLS || — || align=right | 4.7 km || 
|-id=936 bgcolor=#E9E9E9
| 117936 || 4899 P-L || — || September 24, 1960 || Palomar || PLS || — || align=right | 2.7 km || 
|-id=937 bgcolor=#E9E9E9
| 117937 || 5036 P-L || — || October 22, 1960 || Palomar || PLS || — || align=right | 1.9 km || 
|-id=938 bgcolor=#E9E9E9
| 117938 || 6101 P-L || — || September 24, 1960 || Palomar || PLS || MRX || align=right | 2.0 km || 
|-id=939 bgcolor=#E9E9E9
| 117939 || 6122 P-L || — || September 24, 1960 || Palomar || PLS || — || align=right | 2.8 km || 
|-id=940 bgcolor=#d6d6d6
| 117940 || 6191 P-L || — || September 24, 1960 || Palomar || PLS || HYG || align=right | 4.9 km || 
|-id=941 bgcolor=#d6d6d6
| 117941 || 6202 P-L || — || September 24, 1960 || Palomar || PLS || — || align=right | 4.9 km || 
|-id=942 bgcolor=#fefefe
| 117942 || 6210 P-L || — || September 24, 1960 || Palomar || PLS || NYS || align=right data-sort-value="0.92" | 920 m || 
|-id=943 bgcolor=#fefefe
| 117943 || 6219 P-L || — || September 24, 1960 || Palomar || PLS || NYS || align=right data-sort-value="0.97" | 970 m || 
|-id=944 bgcolor=#E9E9E9
| 117944 || 6257 P-L || — || September 24, 1960 || Palomar || PLS || — || align=right | 1.4 km || 
|-id=945 bgcolor=#d6d6d6
| 117945 || 6271 P-L || — || September 24, 1960 || Palomar || PLS || 7:4 || align=right | 6.3 km || 
|-id=946 bgcolor=#d6d6d6
| 117946 || 6276 P-L || — || September 24, 1960 || Palomar || PLS || — || align=right | 4.4 km || 
|-id=947 bgcolor=#fefefe
| 117947 || 6301 P-L || — || September 24, 1960 || Palomar || PLS || NYS || align=right | 1.3 km || 
|-id=948 bgcolor=#d6d6d6
| 117948 || 6315 P-L || — || September 24, 1960 || Palomar || PLS || — || align=right | 4.9 km || 
|-id=949 bgcolor=#fefefe
| 117949 || 6316 P-L || — || September 24, 1960 || Palomar || PLS || NYS || align=right | 1.4 km || 
|-id=950 bgcolor=#d6d6d6
| 117950 || 6337 P-L || — || September 24, 1960 || Palomar || PLS || — || align=right | 4.5 km || 
|-id=951 bgcolor=#d6d6d6
| 117951 || 6369 P-L || — || September 24, 1960 || Palomar || PLS || — || align=right | 6.2 km || 
|-id=952 bgcolor=#E9E9E9
| 117952 || 6376 P-L || — || September 24, 1960 || Palomar || PLS || — || align=right | 3.1 km || 
|-id=953 bgcolor=#fefefe
| 117953 || 6511 P-L || — || September 24, 1960 || Palomar || PLS || EUT || align=right | 1.2 km || 
|-id=954 bgcolor=#fefefe
| 117954 || 6686 P-L || — || September 24, 1960 || Palomar || PLS || — || align=right | 1.3 km || 
|-id=955 bgcolor=#fefefe
| 117955 || 6693 P-L || — || September 24, 1960 || Palomar || PLS || — || align=right | 1.2 km || 
|-id=956 bgcolor=#d6d6d6
| 117956 || 6695 P-L || — || September 24, 1960 || Palomar || PLS || HYG || align=right | 5.1 km || 
|-id=957 bgcolor=#E9E9E9
| 117957 || 6706 P-L || — || September 24, 1960 || Palomar || PLS || — || align=right | 1.9 km || 
|-id=958 bgcolor=#fefefe
| 117958 || 6732 P-L || — || September 24, 1960 || Palomar || PLS || NYS || align=right | 2.1 km || 
|-id=959 bgcolor=#fefefe
| 117959 || 6763 P-L || — || September 26, 1960 || Palomar || PLS || FLO || align=right | 1.3 km || 
|-id=960 bgcolor=#d6d6d6
| 117960 || 6784 P-L || — || September 24, 1960 || Palomar || PLS || — || align=right | 5.0 km || 
|-id=961 bgcolor=#E9E9E9
| 117961 || 6813 P-L || — || September 24, 1960 || Palomar || PLS || AGN || align=right | 2.4 km || 
|-id=962 bgcolor=#fefefe
| 117962 || 6854 P-L || — || September 24, 1960 || Palomar || PLS || — || align=right | 1.3 km || 
|-id=963 bgcolor=#fefefe
| 117963 || 7596 P-L || — || October 17, 1960 || Palomar || PLS || — || align=right | 1.7 km || 
|-id=964 bgcolor=#fefefe
| 117964 || 7619 P-L || — || October 17, 1960 || Palomar || PLS || — || align=right | 1.3 km || 
|-id=965 bgcolor=#fefefe
| 117965 || 9064 P-L || — || October 17, 1960 || Palomar || PLS || FLO || align=right | 1.4 km || 
|-id=966 bgcolor=#E9E9E9
| 117966 || 9524 P-L || — || October 17, 1960 || Palomar || PLS || — || align=right | 2.1 km || 
|-id=967 bgcolor=#fefefe
| 117967 || 9563 P-L || — || October 17, 1960 || Palomar || PLS || NYS || align=right | 1.3 km || 
|-id=968 bgcolor=#fefefe
| 117968 || 9564 P-L || — || October 17, 1960 || Palomar || PLS || NYS || align=right | 1.3 km || 
|-id=969 bgcolor=#fefefe
| 117969 || 9583 P-L || — || October 17, 1960 || Palomar || PLS || — || align=right | 2.2 km || 
|-id=970 bgcolor=#E9E9E9
| 117970 || 9590 P-L || — || September 24, 1960 || Palomar || PLS || — || align=right | 4.7 km || 
|-id=971 bgcolor=#E9E9E9
| 117971 || 9613 P-L || — || October 17, 1960 || Palomar || PLS || — || align=right | 4.8 km || 
|-id=972 bgcolor=#E9E9E9
| 117972 || 1055 T-1 || — || March 25, 1971 || Palomar || PLS || — || align=right | 3.2 km || 
|-id=973 bgcolor=#fefefe
| 117973 || 1073 T-1 || — || March 25, 1971 || Palomar || PLS || — || align=right | 1.4 km || 
|-id=974 bgcolor=#E9E9E9
| 117974 || 1077 T-1 || — || March 25, 1971 || Palomar || PLS || — || align=right | 5.0 km || 
|-id=975 bgcolor=#fefefe
| 117975 || 1131 T-1 || — || March 25, 1971 || Palomar || PLS || — || align=right | 1.4 km || 
|-id=976 bgcolor=#fefefe
| 117976 || 1158 T-1 || — || March 25, 1971 || Palomar || PLS || V || align=right | 1.5 km || 
|-id=977 bgcolor=#E9E9E9
| 117977 || 1192 T-1 || — || March 25, 1971 || Palomar || PLS || JUN || align=right | 1.5 km || 
|-id=978 bgcolor=#E9E9E9
| 117978 || 1215 T-1 || — || March 25, 1971 || Palomar || PLS || GER || align=right | 3.0 km || 
|-id=979 bgcolor=#fefefe
| 117979 || 1233 T-1 || — || March 25, 1971 || Palomar || PLS || — || align=right | 2.8 km || 
|-id=980 bgcolor=#fefefe
| 117980 || 1256 T-1 || — || March 25, 1971 || Palomar || PLS || — || align=right | 1.5 km || 
|-id=981 bgcolor=#fefefe
| 117981 || 2067 T-1 || — || March 25, 1971 || Palomar || PLS || — || align=right | 3.5 km || 
|-id=982 bgcolor=#fefefe
| 117982 || 2134 T-1 || — || March 25, 1971 || Palomar || PLS || SUL || align=right | 3.6 km || 
|-id=983 bgcolor=#fefefe
| 117983 || 2240 T-1 || — || March 25, 1971 || Palomar || PLS || — || align=right | 1.4 km || 
|-id=984 bgcolor=#fefefe
| 117984 || 2283 T-1 || — || March 25, 1971 || Palomar || PLS || — || align=right | 1.2 km || 
|-id=985 bgcolor=#fefefe
| 117985 || 3167 T-1 || — || March 26, 1971 || Palomar || PLS || — || align=right data-sort-value="0.93" | 930 m || 
|-id=986 bgcolor=#E9E9E9
| 117986 || 3176 T-1 || — || March 26, 1971 || Palomar || PLS || — || align=right | 2.5 km || 
|-id=987 bgcolor=#d6d6d6
| 117987 || 4106 T-1 || — || March 26, 1971 || Palomar || PLS || — || align=right | 4.6 km || 
|-id=988 bgcolor=#fefefe
| 117988 || 4300 T-1 || — || March 26, 1971 || Palomar || PLS || NYS || align=right | 1.3 km || 
|-id=989 bgcolor=#fefefe
| 117989 || 4371 T-1 || — || March 26, 1971 || Palomar || PLS || NYS || align=right | 1.3 km || 
|-id=990 bgcolor=#d6d6d6
| 117990 || 1014 T-2 || — || September 29, 1973 || Palomar || PLS || — || align=right | 5.2 km || 
|-id=991 bgcolor=#E9E9E9
| 117991 || 1033 T-2 || — || September 29, 1973 || Palomar || PLS || GEF || align=right | 2.4 km || 
|-id=992 bgcolor=#E9E9E9
| 117992 || 1039 T-2 || — || September 29, 1973 || Palomar || PLS || — || align=right | 3.0 km || 
|-id=993 bgcolor=#d6d6d6
| 117993 Zambujal || 1064 T-2 ||  || September 29, 1973 || Palomar || PLS || 3:2 || align=right | 11 km || 
|-id=994 bgcolor=#E9E9E9
| 117994 || 1076 T-2 || — || September 29, 1973 || Palomar || PLS || — || align=right | 3.1 km || 
|-id=995 bgcolor=#fefefe
| 117995 || 1086 T-2 || — || September 29, 1973 || Palomar || PLS || NYS || align=right | 1.5 km || 
|-id=996 bgcolor=#d6d6d6
| 117996 || 1089 T-2 || — || September 29, 1973 || Palomar || PLS || — || align=right | 6.5 km || 
|-id=997 bgcolor=#fefefe
| 117997 Irazu || 1090 T-2 ||  || September 29, 1973 || Palomar || PLS || H || align=right | 1.1 km || 
|-id=998 bgcolor=#E9E9E9
| 117998 || 1095 T-2 || — || September 29, 1973 || Palomar || PLS || — || align=right | 1.9 km || 
|-id=999 bgcolor=#fefefe
| 117999 || 1113 T-2 || — || September 29, 1973 || Palomar || PLS || NYS || align=right data-sort-value="0.95" | 950 m || 
|-id=000 bgcolor=#fefefe
| 118000 || 1128 T-2 || — || September 29, 1973 || Palomar || PLS || — || align=right | 1.0 km || 
|}

References

External links 
 Discovery Circumstances: Numbered Minor Planets (115001)–(120000) (IAU Minor Planet Center)

0117